

437001–437100 

|-bgcolor=#E9E9E9
| 437001 ||  || — || March 24, 2006 || Kitt Peak || Spacewatch || — || align=right | 1.6 km || 
|-id=002 bgcolor=#E9E9E9
| 437002 ||  || — || November 20, 2003 || Kitt Peak || Spacewatch || AGN || align=right | 1.1 km || 
|-id=003 bgcolor=#E9E9E9
| 437003 ||  || — || October 31, 2008 || Catalina || CSS || — || align=right | 1.4 km || 
|-id=004 bgcolor=#d6d6d6
| 437004 ||  || — || October 16, 2007 || Mount Lemmon || Mount Lemmon Survey ||  || align=right | 2.7 km || 
|-id=005 bgcolor=#d6d6d6
| 437005 ||  || — || September 11, 2007 || Mount Lemmon || Mount Lemmon Survey || — || align=right | 2.5 km || 
|-id=006 bgcolor=#fefefe
| 437006 ||  || — || March 11, 2007 || Kitt Peak || Spacewatch || — || align=right data-sort-value="0.91" | 910 m || 
|-id=007 bgcolor=#E9E9E9
| 437007 ||  || — || September 4, 2007 || Mount Lemmon || Mount Lemmon Survey || — || align=right | 2.0 km || 
|-id=008 bgcolor=#d6d6d6
| 437008 ||  || — || October 21, 2007 || Mount Lemmon || Mount Lemmon Survey || EOS || align=right | 1.7 km || 
|-id=009 bgcolor=#E9E9E9
| 437009 ||  || — || December 1, 2008 || Kitt Peak || Spacewatch || — || align=right | 2.1 km || 
|-id=010 bgcolor=#d6d6d6
| 437010 ||  || — || October 7, 2007 || Catalina || CSS || — || align=right | 2.6 km || 
|-id=011 bgcolor=#E9E9E9
| 437011 ||  || — || May 3, 2006 || Kitt Peak || Spacewatch || — || align=right | 2.0 km || 
|-id=012 bgcolor=#d6d6d6
| 437012 ||  || — || April 10, 2010 || Kitt Peak || Spacewatch || — || align=right | 2.8 km || 
|-id=013 bgcolor=#d6d6d6
| 437013 ||  || — || October 8, 2012 || Mount Lemmon || Mount Lemmon Survey || — || align=right | 3.1 km || 
|-id=014 bgcolor=#E9E9E9
| 437014 ||  || — || September 10, 2007 || Mount Lemmon || Mount Lemmon Survey || HOF || align=right | 3.7 km || 
|-id=015 bgcolor=#d6d6d6
| 437015 ||  || — || September 13, 2007 || Mount Lemmon || Mount Lemmon Survey || KOR || align=right | 1.2 km || 
|-id=016 bgcolor=#d6d6d6
| 437016 ||  || — || February 3, 2009 || Mount Lemmon || Mount Lemmon Survey || — || align=right | 2.4 km || 
|-id=017 bgcolor=#E9E9E9
| 437017 ||  || — || September 25, 2012 || Mount Lemmon || Mount Lemmon Survey || — || align=right | 2.0 km || 
|-id=018 bgcolor=#E9E9E9
| 437018 ||  || — || October 29, 2003 || Kitt Peak || Spacewatch || — || align=right | 2.0 km || 
|-id=019 bgcolor=#E9E9E9
| 437019 ||  || — || September 25, 2012 || Mount Lemmon || Mount Lemmon Survey || — || align=right | 2.1 km || 
|-id=020 bgcolor=#d6d6d6
| 437020 ||  || — || September 12, 2007 || Mount Lemmon || Mount Lemmon Survey || KOR || align=right | 1.2 km || 
|-id=021 bgcolor=#d6d6d6
| 437021 ||  || — || November 16, 2007 || Mount Lemmon || Mount Lemmon Survey || EOS || align=right | 2.1 km || 
|-id=022 bgcolor=#d6d6d6
| 437022 ||  || — || September 20, 2001 || Socorro || LINEAR || — || align=right | 3.0 km || 
|-id=023 bgcolor=#d6d6d6
| 437023 ||  || — || January 31, 2009 || Kitt Peak || Spacewatch || — || align=right | 2.3 km || 
|-id=024 bgcolor=#d6d6d6
| 437024 ||  || — || September 18, 2006 || Kitt Peak || Spacewatch || VER || align=right | 3.0 km || 
|-id=025 bgcolor=#E9E9E9
| 437025 ||  || — || October 22, 2003 || Kitt Peak || Spacewatch || — || align=right | 2.2 km || 
|-id=026 bgcolor=#E9E9E9
| 437026 ||  || — || October 18, 1998 || Kitt Peak || Spacewatch || — || align=right | 2.6 km || 
|-id=027 bgcolor=#d6d6d6
| 437027 ||  || — || October 6, 2012 || Kitt Peak || Spacewatch || — || align=right | 3.3 km || 
|-id=028 bgcolor=#E9E9E9
| 437028 ||  || — || October 21, 2008 || Kitt Peak || Spacewatch || (5) || align=right data-sort-value="0.95" | 950 m || 
|-id=029 bgcolor=#fefefe
| 437029 ||  || — || October 30, 2005 || Mount Lemmon || Mount Lemmon Survey || — || align=right data-sort-value="0.81" | 810 m || 
|-id=030 bgcolor=#E9E9E9
| 437030 ||  || — || August 24, 2007 || Kitt Peak || Spacewatch || AGN || align=right | 1.1 km || 
|-id=031 bgcolor=#d6d6d6
| 437031 ||  || — || October 10, 2007 || Mount Lemmon || Mount Lemmon Survey || — || align=right | 3.4 km || 
|-id=032 bgcolor=#E9E9E9
| 437032 ||  || — || September 18, 2012 || Kitt Peak || Spacewatch || — || align=right | 2.0 km || 
|-id=033 bgcolor=#d6d6d6
| 437033 ||  || — || September 22, 2012 || Kitt Peak || Spacewatch || — || align=right | 3.1 km || 
|-id=034 bgcolor=#E9E9E9
| 437034 ||  || — || March 2, 2006 || Kitt Peak || Spacewatch || — || align=right | 1.6 km || 
|-id=035 bgcolor=#E9E9E9
| 437035 ||  || — || December 7, 1999 || Socorro || LINEAR || — || align=right | 2.0 km || 
|-id=036 bgcolor=#E9E9E9
| 437036 ||  || — || October 25, 2008 || Kitt Peak || Spacewatch || (5) || align=right data-sort-value="0.79" | 790 m || 
|-id=037 bgcolor=#E9E9E9
| 437037 ||  || — || October 6, 1999 || Socorro || LINEAR || EUN || align=right | 1.5 km || 
|-id=038 bgcolor=#E9E9E9
| 437038 ||  || — || October 22, 2008 || Kitt Peak || Spacewatch || EUN || align=right | 1.5 km || 
|-id=039 bgcolor=#d6d6d6
| 437039 ||  || — || December 16, 2007 || Mount Lemmon || Mount Lemmon Survey || — || align=right | 3.2 km || 
|-id=040 bgcolor=#E9E9E9
| 437040 ||  || — || October 7, 2008 || Mount Lemmon || Mount Lemmon Survey || — || align=right | 1.3 km || 
|-id=041 bgcolor=#E9E9E9
| 437041 ||  || — || December 3, 2008 || Mount Lemmon || Mount Lemmon Survey || — || align=right | 2.7 km || 
|-id=042 bgcolor=#E9E9E9
| 437042 ||  || — || March 13, 2005 || Mount Lemmon || Mount Lemmon Survey || ADE || align=right | 2.2 km || 
|-id=043 bgcolor=#d6d6d6
| 437043 ||  || — || November 9, 2001 || Socorro || LINEAR || — || align=right | 4.0 km || 
|-id=044 bgcolor=#E9E9E9
| 437044 ||  || — || July 6, 2003 || Kitt Peak || Spacewatch || — || align=right | 1.9 km || 
|-id=045 bgcolor=#E9E9E9
| 437045 ||  || — || September 18, 2012 || Kitt Peak || Spacewatch || — || align=right | 2.6 km || 
|-id=046 bgcolor=#E9E9E9
| 437046 ||  || — || December 31, 2008 || Kitt Peak || Spacewatch || — || align=right | 2.3 km || 
|-id=047 bgcolor=#fefefe
| 437047 ||  || — || December 18, 2001 || Socorro || LINEAR || — || align=right | 1.0 km || 
|-id=048 bgcolor=#E9E9E9
| 437048 ||  || — || October 29, 2003 || Kitt Peak || Spacewatch || — || align=right | 2.1 km || 
|-id=049 bgcolor=#E9E9E9
| 437049 ||  || — || January 14, 2010 || WISE || WISE || — || align=right | 3.7 km || 
|-id=050 bgcolor=#E9E9E9
| 437050 ||  || — || October 15, 2007 || Kitt Peak || Spacewatch || HOF || align=right | 2.9 km || 
|-id=051 bgcolor=#E9E9E9
| 437051 ||  || — || October 25, 2008 || Mount Lemmon || Mount Lemmon Survey || — || align=right | 1.1 km || 
|-id=052 bgcolor=#E9E9E9
| 437052 ||  || — || November 18, 1995 || Kitt Peak || Spacewatch || — || align=right | 1.9 km || 
|-id=053 bgcolor=#E9E9E9
| 437053 ||  || — || October 8, 2012 || Mount Lemmon || Mount Lemmon Survey || — || align=right | 1.3 km || 
|-id=054 bgcolor=#d6d6d6
| 437054 ||  || — || October 16, 2012 || Kitt Peak || Spacewatch || — || align=right | 3.1 km || 
|-id=055 bgcolor=#d6d6d6
| 437055 ||  || — || August 3, 2010 || WISE || WISE || — || align=right | 3.1 km || 
|-id=056 bgcolor=#d6d6d6
| 437056 ||  || — || November 18, 2007 || Kitt Peak || Spacewatch || — || align=right | 2.5 km || 
|-id=057 bgcolor=#fefefe
| 437057 ||  || — || December 30, 2005 || Kitt Peak || Spacewatch || — || align=right data-sort-value="0.97" | 970 m || 
|-id=058 bgcolor=#E9E9E9
| 437058 ||  || — || December 29, 2008 || Kitt Peak || Spacewatch || — || align=right | 2.2 km || 
|-id=059 bgcolor=#E9E9E9
| 437059 ||  || — || October 28, 2008 || Kitt Peak || Spacewatch || — || align=right | 1.5 km || 
|-id=060 bgcolor=#E9E9E9
| 437060 ||  || — || April 2, 2006 || Kitt Peak || Spacewatch || — || align=right | 1.5 km || 
|-id=061 bgcolor=#E9E9E9
| 437061 ||  || — || September 19, 2003 || Kitt Peak || Spacewatch || — || align=right | 1.8 km || 
|-id=062 bgcolor=#E9E9E9
| 437062 ||  || — || March 18, 2010 || Kitt Peak || Spacewatch || — || align=right | 2.0 km || 
|-id=063 bgcolor=#E9E9E9
| 437063 ||  || — || April 28, 2003 || Kitt Peak || Spacewatch || EUN || align=right data-sort-value="0.82" | 820 m || 
|-id=064 bgcolor=#E9E9E9
| 437064 ||  || — || November 19, 2008 || Mount Lemmon || Mount Lemmon Survey || — || align=right | 1.6 km || 
|-id=065 bgcolor=#E9E9E9
| 437065 ||  || — || March 15, 2010 || Mount Lemmon || Mount Lemmon Survey || — || align=right | 2.2 km || 
|-id=066 bgcolor=#E9E9E9
| 437066 ||  || — || August 10, 2007 || Kitt Peak || Spacewatch || — || align=right | 2.0 km || 
|-id=067 bgcolor=#d6d6d6
| 437067 ||  || — || October 13, 2001 || Kitt Peak || Spacewatch || — || align=right | 3.1 km || 
|-id=068 bgcolor=#d6d6d6
| 437068 ||  || — || October 7, 2007 || Mount Lemmon || Mount Lemmon Survey || — || align=right | 2.3 km || 
|-id=069 bgcolor=#E9E9E9
| 437069 ||  || — || October 9, 2012 || Kitt Peak || Spacewatch || — || align=right | 2.1 km || 
|-id=070 bgcolor=#E9E9E9
| 437070 ||  || — || December 4, 2008 || Mount Lemmon || Mount Lemmon Survey || — || align=right | 2.5 km || 
|-id=071 bgcolor=#fefefe
| 437071 ||  || — || July 6, 1997 || Caussols || ODAS || — || align=right data-sort-value="0.75" | 750 m || 
|-id=072 bgcolor=#d6d6d6
| 437072 ||  || — || November 7, 2007 || Kitt Peak || Spacewatch || — || align=right | 2.7 km || 
|-id=073 bgcolor=#E9E9E9
| 437073 ||  || — || June 16, 2006 || Kitt Peak || Spacewatch || — || align=right | 3.2 km || 
|-id=074 bgcolor=#fefefe
| 437074 ||  || — || August 7, 2008 || Kitt Peak || Spacewatch || — || align=right | 1.2 km || 
|-id=075 bgcolor=#E9E9E9
| 437075 ||  || — || December 4, 2008 || Mount Lemmon || Mount Lemmon Survey || — || align=right | 2.0 km || 
|-id=076 bgcolor=#d6d6d6
| 437076 ||  || — || October 20, 2012 || Kitt Peak || Spacewatch || — || align=right | 2.8 km || 
|-id=077 bgcolor=#E9E9E9
| 437077 ||  || — || October 28, 2008 || Kitt Peak || Spacewatch || — || align=right data-sort-value="0.96" | 960 m || 
|-id=078 bgcolor=#d6d6d6
| 437078 ||  || — || November 19, 2007 || Kitt Peak || Spacewatch || — || align=right | 2.9 km || 
|-id=079 bgcolor=#fefefe
| 437079 ||  || — || March 13, 2011 || Mount Lemmon || Mount Lemmon Survey || — || align=right | 1.2 km || 
|-id=080 bgcolor=#d6d6d6
| 437080 ||  || — || September 30, 2006 || Kitt Peak || Spacewatch || — || align=right | 2.7 km || 
|-id=081 bgcolor=#d6d6d6
| 437081 ||  || — || November 1, 2007 || Mount Lemmon || Mount Lemmon Survey || — || align=right | 1.9 km || 
|-id=082 bgcolor=#E9E9E9
| 437082 ||  || — || November 2, 2008 || Mount Lemmon || Mount Lemmon Survey || — || align=right | 1.3 km || 
|-id=083 bgcolor=#E9E9E9
| 437083 ||  || — || October 28, 2008 || Kitt Peak || Spacewatch || — || align=right data-sort-value="0.86" | 860 m || 
|-id=084 bgcolor=#E9E9E9
| 437084 ||  || — || April 18, 2007 || Mount Lemmon || Mount Lemmon Survey || — || align=right data-sort-value="0.86" | 860 m || 
|-id=085 bgcolor=#E9E9E9
| 437085 ||  || — || April 2, 2006 || Kitt Peak || Spacewatch || — || align=right | 2.2 km || 
|-id=086 bgcolor=#E9E9E9
| 437086 ||  || — || May 22, 2011 || Mount Lemmon || Mount Lemmon Survey || — || align=right | 1.3 km || 
|-id=087 bgcolor=#E9E9E9
| 437087 ||  || — || September 12, 2007 || Catalina || CSS || — || align=right | 2.4 km || 
|-id=088 bgcolor=#fefefe
| 437088 ||  || — || March 27, 2011 || Mount Lemmon || Mount Lemmon Survey || — || align=right data-sort-value="0.83" | 830 m || 
|-id=089 bgcolor=#E9E9E9
| 437089 ||  || — || October 6, 2012 || Mount Lemmon || Mount Lemmon Survey || PAD || align=right | 1.6 km || 
|-id=090 bgcolor=#d6d6d6
| 437090 ||  || — || November 19, 2007 || Kitt Peak || Spacewatch || EOS || align=right | 2.1 km || 
|-id=091 bgcolor=#E9E9E9
| 437091 ||  || — || October 27, 2003 || Kitt Peak || Spacewatch || — || align=right | 2.2 km || 
|-id=092 bgcolor=#d6d6d6
| 437092 ||  || — || May 30, 2006 || Kitt Peak || Spacewatch || — || align=right | 2.6 km || 
|-id=093 bgcolor=#fefefe
| 437093 ||  || — || September 30, 2005 || Mount Lemmon || Mount Lemmon Survey || — || align=right data-sort-value="0.78" | 780 m || 
|-id=094 bgcolor=#E9E9E9
| 437094 ||  || — || June 2, 2010 || WISE || WISE || — || align=right | 2.3 km || 
|-id=095 bgcolor=#d6d6d6
| 437095 ||  || — || September 20, 2006 || Kitt Peak || Spacewatch || — || align=right | 2.5 km || 
|-id=096 bgcolor=#d6d6d6
| 437096 ||  || — || February 16, 2010 || WISE || WISE || — || align=right | 5.9 km || 
|-id=097 bgcolor=#d6d6d6
| 437097 ||  || — || February 20, 2009 || Kitt Peak || Spacewatch || — || align=right | 2.3 km || 
|-id=098 bgcolor=#E9E9E9
| 437098 ||  || — || September 21, 2012 || Kitt Peak || Spacewatch || — || align=right | 2.4 km || 
|-id=099 bgcolor=#E9E9E9
| 437099 ||  || — || October 20, 2003 || Kitt Peak || Spacewatch || — || align=right | 2.3 km || 
|-id=100 bgcolor=#d6d6d6
| 437100 ||  || — || November 3, 2007 || Kitt Peak || Spacewatch || — || align=right | 2.6 km || 
|}

437101–437200 

|-bgcolor=#d6d6d6
| 437101 ||  || — || October 8, 2007 || Kitt Peak || Spacewatch || KOR || align=right | 1.3 km || 
|-id=102 bgcolor=#d6d6d6
| 437102 ||  || — || September 17, 2006 || Kitt Peak || Spacewatch || — || align=right | 2.7 km || 
|-id=103 bgcolor=#E9E9E9
| 437103 ||  || — || March 26, 2006 || Kitt Peak || Spacewatch || — || align=right | 1.8 km || 
|-id=104 bgcolor=#d6d6d6
| 437104 ||  || — || December 22, 2008 || Mount Lemmon || Mount Lemmon Survey || — || align=right | 2.0 km || 
|-id=105 bgcolor=#E9E9E9
| 437105 ||  || — || November 7, 2008 || Mount Lemmon || Mount Lemmon Survey || — || align=right | 1.7 km || 
|-id=106 bgcolor=#E9E9E9
| 437106 ||  || — || October 27, 1994 || Kitt Peak || Spacewatch || — || align=right | 2.9 km || 
|-id=107 bgcolor=#d6d6d6
| 437107 ||  || — || October 4, 2007 || Kitt Peak || Spacewatch || KOR || align=right | 1.2 km || 
|-id=108 bgcolor=#d6d6d6
| 437108 ||  || — || October 8, 2012 || Kitt Peak || Spacewatch || — || align=right | 3.3 km || 
|-id=109 bgcolor=#d6d6d6
| 437109 ||  || — || January 31, 2009 || Mount Lemmon || Mount Lemmon Survey || — || align=right | 2.5 km || 
|-id=110 bgcolor=#d6d6d6
| 437110 ||  || — || December 22, 2008 || Kitt Peak || Spacewatch || — || align=right | 2.0 km || 
|-id=111 bgcolor=#d6d6d6
| 437111 ||  || — || October 9, 2012 || Mount Lemmon || Mount Lemmon Survey || — || align=right | 3.2 km || 
|-id=112 bgcolor=#d6d6d6
| 437112 ||  || — || March 16, 2009 || Mount Lemmon || Mount Lemmon Survey || EOS || align=right | 2.3 km || 
|-id=113 bgcolor=#d6d6d6
| 437113 ||  || — || December 15, 2001 || Socorro || LINEAR || — || align=right | 3.2 km || 
|-id=114 bgcolor=#E9E9E9
| 437114 ||  || — || December 4, 2008 || Kitt Peak || Spacewatch || (5) || align=right data-sort-value="0.72" | 720 m || 
|-id=115 bgcolor=#E9E9E9
| 437115 ||  || — || November 15, 2003 || Kitt Peak || Spacewatch || — || align=right | 2.5 km || 
|-id=116 bgcolor=#E9E9E9
| 437116 ||  || — || March 18, 2010 || Mount Lemmon || Mount Lemmon Survey || HOF || align=right | 2.8 km || 
|-id=117 bgcolor=#E9E9E9
| 437117 ||  || — || October 10, 2008 || Mount Lemmon || Mount Lemmon Survey || (5) || align=right data-sort-value="0.87" | 870 m || 
|-id=118 bgcolor=#d6d6d6
| 437118 ||  || — || July 28, 2011 || Haleakala || Pan-STARRS || — || align=right | 3.8 km || 
|-id=119 bgcolor=#E9E9E9
| 437119 ||  || — || November 22, 2008 || Kitt Peak || Spacewatch || — || align=right | 2.7 km || 
|-id=120 bgcolor=#d6d6d6
| 437120 ||  || — || November 15, 2007 || Catalina || CSS || — || align=right | 3.0 km || 
|-id=121 bgcolor=#E9E9E9
| 437121 ||  || — || October 13, 1999 || Kitt Peak || Spacewatch || — || align=right | 1.1 km || 
|-id=122 bgcolor=#d6d6d6
| 437122 ||  || — || October 6, 1996 || Kitt Peak || Spacewatch || — || align=right | 2.2 km || 
|-id=123 bgcolor=#d6d6d6
| 437123 ||  || — || January 20, 2009 || Kitt Peak || Spacewatch || — || align=right | 3.2 km || 
|-id=124 bgcolor=#d6d6d6
| 437124 ||  || — || October 15, 2012 || Mount Lemmon || Mount Lemmon Survey || — || align=right | 2.6 km || 
|-id=125 bgcolor=#E9E9E9
| 437125 ||  || — || December 31, 2008 || Mount Lemmon || Mount Lemmon Survey || — || align=right | 1.2 km || 
|-id=126 bgcolor=#E9E9E9
| 437126 ||  || — || May 9, 2011 || Kitt Peak || Spacewatch || — || align=right data-sort-value="0.98" | 980 m || 
|-id=127 bgcolor=#d6d6d6
| 437127 ||  || — || September 22, 1995 || Kitt Peak || Spacewatch || HYG || align=right | 2.5 km || 
|-id=128 bgcolor=#E9E9E9
| 437128 ||  || — || March 11, 2005 || Mount Lemmon || Mount Lemmon Survey || — || align=right | 2.0 km || 
|-id=129 bgcolor=#d6d6d6
| 437129 ||  || — || November 9, 2007 || Kitt Peak || Spacewatch || — || align=right | 2.6 km || 
|-id=130 bgcolor=#E9E9E9
| 437130 ||  || — || December 30, 2008 || Kitt Peak || Spacewatch || — || align=right | 2.2 km || 
|-id=131 bgcolor=#fefefe
| 437131 ||  || — || September 7, 2004 || Socorro || LINEAR || — || align=right data-sort-value="0.86" | 860 m || 
|-id=132 bgcolor=#fefefe
| 437132 ||  || — || September 9, 2008 || Mount Lemmon || Mount Lemmon Survey || — || align=right data-sort-value="0.83" | 830 m || 
|-id=133 bgcolor=#fefefe
| 437133 ||  || — || July 24, 1979 || Palomar || S. J. Bus || — || align=right data-sort-value="0.94" | 940 m || 
|-id=134 bgcolor=#E9E9E9
| 437134 ||  || — || September 13, 2007 || Kitt Peak || Spacewatch || AGN || align=right | 1.5 km || 
|-id=135 bgcolor=#fefefe
| 437135 ||  || — || February 22, 1998 || Kitt Peak || Spacewatch || — || align=right data-sort-value="0.94" | 940 m || 
|-id=136 bgcolor=#E9E9E9
| 437136 ||  || — || November 9, 2008 || Mount Lemmon || Mount Lemmon Survey || — || align=right | 1.8 km || 
|-id=137 bgcolor=#E9E9E9
| 437137 ||  || — || September 7, 1999 || Socorro || LINEAR || ADE || align=right | 1.8 km || 
|-id=138 bgcolor=#d6d6d6
| 437138 ||  || — || September 12, 2007 || Mount Lemmon || Mount Lemmon Survey || KOR || align=right | 1.4 km || 
|-id=139 bgcolor=#E9E9E9
| 437139 ||  || — || September 10, 2007 || Kitt Peak || Spacewatch || — || align=right | 1.8 km || 
|-id=140 bgcolor=#E9E9E9
| 437140 ||  || — || October 22, 2003 || Kitt Peak || Spacewatch || — || align=right | 2.2 km || 
|-id=141 bgcolor=#E9E9E9
| 437141 ||  || — || September 11, 2007 || Mount Lemmon || Mount Lemmon Survey || AGN || align=right | 1.0 km || 
|-id=142 bgcolor=#d6d6d6
| 437142 ||  || — || May 20, 2010 || Mount Lemmon || Mount Lemmon Survey || EOS || align=right | 2.3 km || 
|-id=143 bgcolor=#d6d6d6
| 437143 ||  || — || September 20, 2007 || Kitt Peak || Spacewatch || — || align=right | 2.0 km || 
|-id=144 bgcolor=#E9E9E9
| 437144 ||  || — || October 23, 2008 || Mount Lemmon || Mount Lemmon Survey || — || align=right data-sort-value="0.83" | 830 m || 
|-id=145 bgcolor=#d6d6d6
| 437145 ||  || — || December 5, 2007 || Mount Lemmon || Mount Lemmon Survey || EOS || align=right | 2.2 km || 
|-id=146 bgcolor=#d6d6d6
| 437146 ||  || — || October 2, 2006 || Mount Lemmon || Mount Lemmon Survey || EOS || align=right | 1.7 km || 
|-id=147 bgcolor=#E9E9E9
| 437147 ||  || — || May 7, 2006 || Mount Lemmon || Mount Lemmon Survey || — || align=right | 2.6 km || 
|-id=148 bgcolor=#d6d6d6
| 437148 ||  || — || April 23, 2004 || Desert Eagle || W. K. Y. Yeung || — || align=right | 2.6 km || 
|-id=149 bgcolor=#E9E9E9
| 437149 ||  || — || October 31, 2008 || Kitt Peak || Spacewatch || — || align=right data-sort-value="0.89" | 890 m || 
|-id=150 bgcolor=#d6d6d6
| 437150 ||  || — || October 3, 2006 || Mount Lemmon || Mount Lemmon Survey || HYG || align=right | 2.8 km || 
|-id=151 bgcolor=#E9E9E9
| 437151 ||  || — || October 19, 2003 || Kitt Peak || Spacewatch || — || align=right | 2.0 km || 
|-id=152 bgcolor=#d6d6d6
| 437152 ||  || — || April 2, 2009 || Mount Lemmon || Mount Lemmon Survey || URS || align=right | 2.7 km || 
|-id=153 bgcolor=#E9E9E9
| 437153 ||  || — || November 7, 2012 || Kitt Peak || Spacewatch || EUN || align=right | 1.6 km || 
|-id=154 bgcolor=#d6d6d6
| 437154 ||  || — || October 8, 2012 || Mount Lemmon || Mount Lemmon Survey || — || align=right | 2.6 km || 
|-id=155 bgcolor=#d6d6d6
| 437155 ||  || — || October 10, 2007 || Kitt Peak || Spacewatch || — || align=right | 3.6 km || 
|-id=156 bgcolor=#d6d6d6
| 437156 ||  || — || November 14, 2007 || Mount Lemmon || Mount Lemmon Survey || — || align=right | 3.0 km || 
|-id=157 bgcolor=#d6d6d6
| 437157 ||  || — || November 14, 2007 || Kitt Peak || Spacewatch || TEL || align=right | 1.8 km || 
|-id=158 bgcolor=#E9E9E9
| 437158 ||  || — || April 26, 2011 || Kitt Peak || Spacewatch || — || align=right data-sort-value="0.98" | 980 m || 
|-id=159 bgcolor=#E9E9E9
| 437159 ||  || — || January 31, 2006 || Kitt Peak || Spacewatch || — || align=right data-sort-value="0.96" | 960 m || 
|-id=160 bgcolor=#d6d6d6
| 437160 ||  || — || October 9, 2012 || Mount Lemmon || Mount Lemmon Survey || EOS || align=right | 2.7 km || 
|-id=161 bgcolor=#d6d6d6
| 437161 ||  || — || October 16, 2007 || Mount Lemmon || Mount Lemmon Survey || — || align=right | 2.5 km || 
|-id=162 bgcolor=#d6d6d6
| 437162 ||  || — || April 22, 2004 || Kitt Peak || Spacewatch || — || align=right | 2.6 km || 
|-id=163 bgcolor=#E9E9E9
| 437163 ||  || — || September 14, 2007 || Catalina || CSS || — || align=right | 1.7 km || 
|-id=164 bgcolor=#E9E9E9
| 437164 ||  || — || October 29, 2008 || Mount Lemmon || Mount Lemmon Survey || — || align=right data-sort-value="0.97" | 970 m || 
|-id=165 bgcolor=#d6d6d6
| 437165 ||  || — || September 12, 2007 || Mount Lemmon || Mount Lemmon Survey || KOR || align=right | 1.1 km || 
|-id=166 bgcolor=#E9E9E9
| 437166 ||  || — || September 23, 1998 || Kitt Peak || Spacewatch || — || align=right | 1.9 km || 
|-id=167 bgcolor=#d6d6d6
| 437167 ||  || — || October 15, 2007 || Mount Lemmon || Mount Lemmon Survey || NAE || align=right | 2.1 km || 
|-id=168 bgcolor=#d6d6d6
| 437168 ||  || — || May 8, 2005 || Kitt Peak || Spacewatch || — || align=right | 2.5 km || 
|-id=169 bgcolor=#E9E9E9
| 437169 ||  || — || November 19, 2008 || Mount Lemmon || Mount Lemmon Survey || — || align=right data-sort-value="0.95" | 950 m || 
|-id=170 bgcolor=#E9E9E9
| 437170 ||  || — || January 1, 2009 || Kitt Peak || Spacewatch || — || align=right | 1.8 km || 
|-id=171 bgcolor=#d6d6d6
| 437171 ||  || — || October 10, 2007 || Kitt Peak || Spacewatch || — || align=right | 2.2 km || 
|-id=172 bgcolor=#E9E9E9
| 437172 ||  || — || November 1, 2008 || Mount Lemmon || Mount Lemmon Survey || (5) || align=right data-sort-value="0.70" | 700 m || 
|-id=173 bgcolor=#d6d6d6
| 437173 ||  || — || October 8, 2012 || Kitt Peak || Spacewatch || — || align=right | 2.9 km || 
|-id=174 bgcolor=#d6d6d6
| 437174 ||  || — || October 30, 2007 || Mount Lemmon || Mount Lemmon Survey || KOR || align=right | 1.2 km || 
|-id=175 bgcolor=#E9E9E9
| 437175 ||  || — || October 27, 2003 || Kitt Peak || Spacewatch || — || align=right | 2.0 km || 
|-id=176 bgcolor=#E9E9E9
| 437176 ||  || — || December 29, 2008 || Mount Lemmon || Mount Lemmon Survey || HOF || align=right | 2.4 km || 
|-id=177 bgcolor=#E9E9E9
| 437177 ||  || — || November 19, 2003 || Kitt Peak || Spacewatch || MRX || align=right data-sort-value="0.98" | 980 m || 
|-id=178 bgcolor=#E9E9E9
| 437178 ||  || — || November 15, 2003 || Kitt Peak || Spacewatch || — || align=right | 2.3 km || 
|-id=179 bgcolor=#E9E9E9
| 437179 ||  || — || October 22, 2003 || Kitt Peak || Spacewatch ||  || align=right | 1.4 km || 
|-id=180 bgcolor=#E9E9E9
| 437180 ||  || — || March 18, 2010 || Kitt Peak || Spacewatch || — || align=right | 1.8 km || 
|-id=181 bgcolor=#E9E9E9
| 437181 ||  || — || January 16, 2005 || Kitt Peak || Spacewatch || — || align=right | 1.6 km || 
|-id=182 bgcolor=#E9E9E9
| 437182 ||  || — || October 31, 1999 || Kitt Peak || Spacewatch || EUN || align=right data-sort-value="0.97" | 970 m || 
|-id=183 bgcolor=#d6d6d6
| 437183 ||  || — || October 21, 2012 || Kitt Peak || Spacewatch || VER || align=right | 2.9 km || 
|-id=184 bgcolor=#d6d6d6
| 437184 ||  || — || February 23, 2010 || WISE || WISE || — || align=right | 4.7 km || 
|-id=185 bgcolor=#d6d6d6
| 437185 ||  || — || November 4, 2007 || Kitt Peak || Spacewatch || — || align=right | 3.5 km || 
|-id=186 bgcolor=#d6d6d6
| 437186 ||  || — || August 21, 2006 || Kitt Peak || Spacewatch || — || align=right | 2.8 km || 
|-id=187 bgcolor=#E9E9E9
| 437187 ||  || — || August 21, 2007 || Anderson Mesa || LONEOS || — || align=right | 2.7 km || 
|-id=188 bgcolor=#E9E9E9
| 437188 ||  || — || November 19, 2008 || Mount Lemmon || Mount Lemmon Survey || — || align=right | 1.7 km || 
|-id=189 bgcolor=#d6d6d6
| 437189 ||  || — || July 26, 1995 || Kitt Peak || Spacewatch || — || align=right | 3.7 km || 
|-id=190 bgcolor=#fefefe
| 437190 ||  || — || March 16, 2007 || Mount Lemmon || Mount Lemmon Survey || — || align=right data-sort-value="0.89" | 890 m || 
|-id=191 bgcolor=#d6d6d6
| 437191 ||  || — || November 2, 2007 || Mount Lemmon || Mount Lemmon Survey || — || align=right | 2.3 km || 
|-id=192 bgcolor=#d6d6d6
| 437192 Frederikolsen ||  ||  || August 27, 2011 || Zelenchukskaya || T. V. Kryachko || — || align=right | 4.2 km || 
|-id=193 bgcolor=#d6d6d6
| 437193 ||  || — || October 14, 2012 || Kitt Peak || Spacewatch || — || align=right | 2.8 km || 
|-id=194 bgcolor=#E9E9E9
| 437194 ||  || — || December 31, 2008 || Mount Lemmon || Mount Lemmon Survey || — || align=right | 2.3 km || 
|-id=195 bgcolor=#d6d6d6
| 437195 ||  || — || October 21, 2012 || Kitt Peak || Spacewatch || — || align=right | 2.9 km || 
|-id=196 bgcolor=#E9E9E9
| 437196 ||  || — || October 21, 2008 || Kitt Peak || Spacewatch || MAR || align=right data-sort-value="0.72" | 720 m || 
|-id=197 bgcolor=#E9E9E9
| 437197 ||  || — || September 19, 2007 || Kitt Peak || Spacewatch || — || align=right | 1.9 km || 
|-id=198 bgcolor=#d6d6d6
| 437198 ||  || — || September 14, 2006 || Kitt Peak || Spacewatch || VER || align=right | 2.3 km || 
|-id=199 bgcolor=#E9E9E9
| 437199 ||  || — || December 15, 2004 || Socorro || LINEAR || — || align=right | 1.2 km || 
|-id=200 bgcolor=#d6d6d6
| 437200 ||  || — || November 14, 2007 || Kitt Peak || Spacewatch || — || align=right | 2.7 km || 
|}

437201–437300 

|-bgcolor=#d6d6d6
| 437201 ||  || — || November 17, 2001 || Kitt Peak || Spacewatch || EOS || align=right | 2.4 km || 
|-id=202 bgcolor=#d6d6d6
| 437202 ||  || — || September 17, 2006 || Kitt Peak || Spacewatch || — || align=right | 2.5 km || 
|-id=203 bgcolor=#d6d6d6
| 437203 ||  || — || May 9, 2004 || Kitt Peak || Spacewatch || — || align=right | 2.7 km || 
|-id=204 bgcolor=#d6d6d6
| 437204 ||  || — || October 2, 2006 || Mount Lemmon || Mount Lemmon Survey || VER || align=right | 2.6 km || 
|-id=205 bgcolor=#d6d6d6
| 437205 ||  || — || January 7, 2009 || Kitt Peak || Spacewatch || — || align=right | 2.2 km || 
|-id=206 bgcolor=#d6d6d6
| 437206 ||  || — || January 16, 2009 || Kitt Peak || Spacewatch || KOR || align=right | 1.4 km || 
|-id=207 bgcolor=#E9E9E9
| 437207 ||  || — || September 15, 2007 || Kitt Peak || Spacewatch || — || align=right | 1.7 km || 
|-id=208 bgcolor=#E9E9E9
| 437208 ||  || — || October 28, 2008 || Kitt Peak || Spacewatch || — || align=right | 1.0 km || 
|-id=209 bgcolor=#d6d6d6
| 437209 ||  || — || November 2, 2007 || Kitt Peak || Spacewatch || — || align=right | 2.3 km || 
|-id=210 bgcolor=#d6d6d6
| 437210 ||  || — || May 10, 2010 || WISE || WISE || — || align=right | 3.5 km || 
|-id=211 bgcolor=#E9E9E9
| 437211 ||  || — || April 26, 2006 || Mount Lemmon || Mount Lemmon Survey || — || align=right | 2.6 km || 
|-id=212 bgcolor=#E9E9E9
| 437212 ||  || — || March 19, 2010 || Mount Lemmon || Mount Lemmon Survey || — || align=right | 2.2 km || 
|-id=213 bgcolor=#E9E9E9
| 437213 ||  || — || December 9, 2004 || Kitt Peak || Spacewatch || (5) || align=right data-sort-value="0.87" | 870 m || 
|-id=214 bgcolor=#E9E9E9
| 437214 ||  || — || November 18, 2008 || Catalina || CSS || — || align=right | 1.1 km || 
|-id=215 bgcolor=#d6d6d6
| 437215 ||  || — || October 21, 2006 || Kitt Peak || Spacewatch || — || align=right | 3.0 km || 
|-id=216 bgcolor=#d6d6d6
| 437216 ||  || — || December 4, 2007 || Kitt Peak || Spacewatch || — || align=right | 3.4 km || 
|-id=217 bgcolor=#E9E9E9
| 437217 ||  || — || December 22, 2008 || Kitt Peak || Spacewatch || — || align=right | 1.7 km || 
|-id=218 bgcolor=#E9E9E9
| 437218 ||  || — || November 7, 2012 || Mount Lemmon || Mount Lemmon Survey || — || align=right | 2.0 km || 
|-id=219 bgcolor=#E9E9E9
| 437219 ||  || — || December 2, 2008 || Kitt Peak || Spacewatch || — || align=right | 1.9 km || 
|-id=220 bgcolor=#d6d6d6
| 437220 ||  || — || August 27, 2006 || Anderson Mesa || LONEOS || — || align=right | 3.3 km || 
|-id=221 bgcolor=#d6d6d6
| 437221 ||  || — || April 17, 2009 || Mount Lemmon || Mount Lemmon Survey || — || align=right | 3.7 km || 
|-id=222 bgcolor=#d6d6d6
| 437222 ||  || — || February 16, 2010 || WISE || WISE || — || align=right | 4.0 km || 
|-id=223 bgcolor=#d6d6d6
| 437223 ||  || — || November 13, 2007 || Mount Lemmon || Mount Lemmon Survey || — || align=right | 3.2 km || 
|-id=224 bgcolor=#E9E9E9
| 437224 ||  || — || October 14, 1995 || Xinglong || SCAP || (5) || align=right | 1.1 km || 
|-id=225 bgcolor=#E9E9E9
| 437225 ||  || — || December 1, 2008 || Kitt Peak || Spacewatch || — || align=right | 1.3 km || 
|-id=226 bgcolor=#E9E9E9
| 437226 ||  || — || April 28, 2003 || Kitt Peak || Spacewatch || — || align=right | 1.5 km || 
|-id=227 bgcolor=#E9E9E9
| 437227 ||  || — || September 14, 2007 || Kitt Peak || Spacewatch || — || align=right | 2.0 km || 
|-id=228 bgcolor=#d6d6d6
| 437228 ||  || — || October 4, 2006 || Mount Lemmon || Mount Lemmon Survey || — || align=right | 2.9 km || 
|-id=229 bgcolor=#d6d6d6
| 437229 ||  || — || September 22, 2001 || Kitt Peak || Spacewatch || — || align=right | 3.5 km || 
|-id=230 bgcolor=#d6d6d6
| 437230 ||  || — || January 11, 2008 || Mount Lemmon || Mount Lemmon Survey || — || align=right | 2.8 km || 
|-id=231 bgcolor=#d6d6d6
| 437231 ||  || — || November 4, 2007 || Mount Lemmon || Mount Lemmon Survey || — || align=right | 2.1 km || 
|-id=232 bgcolor=#d6d6d6
| 437232 ||  || — || November 2, 2007 || Mount Lemmon || Mount Lemmon Survey || — || align=right | 3.8 km || 
|-id=233 bgcolor=#E9E9E9
| 437233 ||  || — || May 23, 2011 || Mount Lemmon || Mount Lemmon Survey || (5) || align=right | 1.1 km || 
|-id=234 bgcolor=#d6d6d6
| 437234 ||  || — || October 22, 2012 || Mount Lemmon || Mount Lemmon Survey || EOS || align=right | 2.0 km || 
|-id=235 bgcolor=#E9E9E9
| 437235 ||  || — || October 11, 2007 || Kitt Peak || Spacewatch || GEF || align=right | 1.4 km || 
|-id=236 bgcolor=#d6d6d6
| 437236 ||  || — || December 19, 2007 || Mount Lemmon || Mount Lemmon Survey || — || align=right | 3.6 km || 
|-id=237 bgcolor=#E9E9E9
| 437237 ||  || — || November 30, 2003 || Kitt Peak || Spacewatch || — || align=right | 1.8 km || 
|-id=238 bgcolor=#E9E9E9
| 437238 ||  || — || December 14, 2003 || Kitt Peak || Spacewatch || — || align=right | 1.9 km || 
|-id=239 bgcolor=#d6d6d6
| 437239 ||  || — || December 16, 2007 || Kitt Peak || Spacewatch || — || align=right | 3.2 km || 
|-id=240 bgcolor=#E9E9E9
| 437240 ||  || — || November 18, 2003 || Kitt Peak || Spacewatch || — || align=right | 1.9 km || 
|-id=241 bgcolor=#E9E9E9
| 437241 ||  || — || August 8, 2007 || Siding Spring || SSS || — || align=right | 1.8 km || 
|-id=242 bgcolor=#fefefe
| 437242 ||  || — || November 20, 2001 || Socorro || LINEAR || — || align=right data-sort-value="0.92" | 920 m || 
|-id=243 bgcolor=#d6d6d6
| 437243 ||  || — || November 16, 2006 || Mount Lemmon || Mount Lemmon Survey || — || align=right | 2.9 km || 
|-id=244 bgcolor=#d6d6d6
| 437244 ||  || — || October 17, 2007 || Mount Lemmon || Mount Lemmon Survey || KOR || align=right | 1.3 km || 
|-id=245 bgcolor=#d6d6d6
| 437245 ||  || — || August 3, 2010 || WISE || WISE || EMA || align=right | 3.4 km || 
|-id=246 bgcolor=#d6d6d6
| 437246 ||  || — || May 8, 2005 || Kitt Peak || Spacewatch || KOR || align=right | 1.5 km || 
|-id=247 bgcolor=#d6d6d6
| 437247 ||  || — || November 17, 1995 || Kitt Peak || Spacewatch || — || align=right | 3.4 km || 
|-id=248 bgcolor=#E9E9E9
| 437248 ||  || — || February 14, 2010 || Kitt Peak || Spacewatch || — || align=right | 1.3 km || 
|-id=249 bgcolor=#E9E9E9
| 437249 ||  || — || July 22, 2007 || Siding Spring || SSS || — || align=right | 1.8 km || 
|-id=250 bgcolor=#E9E9E9
| 437250 ||  || — || July 1, 2011 || Kitt Peak || Spacewatch || AGN || align=right | 1.2 km || 
|-id=251 bgcolor=#d6d6d6
| 437251 ||  || — || April 21, 2009 || Mount Lemmon || Mount Lemmon Survey || URS || align=right | 3.4 km || 
|-id=252 bgcolor=#E9E9E9
| 437252 ||  || — || April 19, 1998 || Kitt Peak || Spacewatch || EUN || align=right | 1.5 km || 
|-id=253 bgcolor=#d6d6d6
| 437253 ||  || — || September 28, 2006 || Mount Lemmon || Mount Lemmon Survey || — || align=right | 2.1 km || 
|-id=254 bgcolor=#E9E9E9
| 437254 ||  || — || January 17, 2005 || Socorro || LINEAR || EUN || align=right | 1.6 km || 
|-id=255 bgcolor=#E9E9E9
| 437255 ||  || — || November 26, 2003 || Kitt Peak || Spacewatch || AGN || align=right | 1.1 km || 
|-id=256 bgcolor=#E9E9E9
| 437256 ||  || — || December 9, 2004 || Kitt Peak || Spacewatch || EUN || align=right | 1.5 km || 
|-id=257 bgcolor=#d6d6d6
| 437257 ||  || — || November 26, 2012 || Mount Lemmon || Mount Lemmon Survey || — || align=right | 2.9 km || 
|-id=258 bgcolor=#d6d6d6
| 437258 ||  || — || November 7, 2007 || Kitt Peak || Spacewatch || EOS || align=right | 1.9 km || 
|-id=259 bgcolor=#E9E9E9
| 437259 ||  || — || October 17, 1995 || Kitt Peak || Spacewatch || — || align=right | 1.4 km || 
|-id=260 bgcolor=#d6d6d6
| 437260 ||  || — || December 18, 2001 || Socorro || LINEAR || — || align=right | 3.2 km || 
|-id=261 bgcolor=#E9E9E9
| 437261 ||  || — || December 16, 2004 || Catalina || CSS || — || align=right | 1.4 km || 
|-id=262 bgcolor=#d6d6d6
| 437262 ||  || — || November 2, 2007 || Kitt Peak || Spacewatch || — || align=right | 2.6 km || 
|-id=263 bgcolor=#d6d6d6
| 437263 ||  || — || November 5, 2012 || Kitt Peak || Spacewatch || — || align=right | 3.8 km || 
|-id=264 bgcolor=#d6d6d6
| 437264 ||  || — || December 20, 2001 || Kitt Peak || Spacewatch || — || align=right | 3.6 km || 
|-id=265 bgcolor=#d6d6d6
| 437265 ||  || — || January 15, 2008 || Kitt Peak || Spacewatch || — || align=right | 2.4 km || 
|-id=266 bgcolor=#E9E9E9
| 437266 ||  || — || November 21, 2008 || Kitt Peak || Spacewatch || (5) || align=right data-sort-value="0.81" | 810 m || 
|-id=267 bgcolor=#E9E9E9
| 437267 ||  || — || May 12, 2010 || Mount Lemmon || Mount Lemmon Survey || — || align=right | 2.3 km || 
|-id=268 bgcolor=#E9E9E9
| 437268 ||  || — || October 11, 2007 || Mount Lemmon || Mount Lemmon Survey || MRX || align=right | 1.3 km || 
|-id=269 bgcolor=#d6d6d6
| 437269 ||  || — || November 14, 2007 || Mount Lemmon || Mount Lemmon Survey || — || align=right | 3.3 km || 
|-id=270 bgcolor=#E9E9E9
| 437270 ||  || — || July 30, 2008 || Mount Lemmon || Mount Lemmon Survey || — || align=right | 1.4 km || 
|-id=271 bgcolor=#d6d6d6
| 437271 ||  || — || May 4, 2005 || Kitt Peak || Spacewatch || — || align=right | 2.9 km || 
|-id=272 bgcolor=#d6d6d6
| 437272 ||  || — || September 28, 2006 || Catalina || CSS || — || align=right | 3.7 km || 
|-id=273 bgcolor=#d6d6d6
| 437273 ||  || — || June 11, 2010 || Mount Lemmon || Mount Lemmon Survey || — || align=right | 2.9 km || 
|-id=274 bgcolor=#d6d6d6
| 437274 ||  || — || November 8, 2007 || Mount Lemmon || Mount Lemmon Survey || — || align=right | 3.1 km || 
|-id=275 bgcolor=#d6d6d6
| 437275 ||  || — || December 15, 2001 || Socorro || LINEAR || — || align=right | 3.7 km || 
|-id=276 bgcolor=#d6d6d6
| 437276 ||  || — || September 19, 2006 || Catalina || CSS || — || align=right | 3.5 km || 
|-id=277 bgcolor=#E9E9E9
| 437277 ||  || — || June 2, 2011 || Mount Lemmon || Mount Lemmon Survey || — || align=right | 2.0 km || 
|-id=278 bgcolor=#d6d6d6
| 437278 ||  || — || October 21, 2006 || Mount Lemmon || Mount Lemmon Survey || — || align=right | 3.7 km || 
|-id=279 bgcolor=#d6d6d6
| 437279 ||  || — || June 11, 2010 || Mount Lemmon || Mount Lemmon Survey || — || align=right | 3.0 km || 
|-id=280 bgcolor=#C2FFFF
| 437280 ||  || — || November 26, 2009 || Mount Lemmon || Mount Lemmon Survey || L4 || align=right | 10 km || 
|-id=281 bgcolor=#d6d6d6
| 437281 ||  || — || November 18, 2007 || Mount Lemmon || Mount Lemmon Survey || — || align=right | 2.4 km || 
|-id=282 bgcolor=#E9E9E9
| 437282 ||  || — || June 8, 2007 || Kitt Peak || Spacewatch || — || align=right | 1.2 km || 
|-id=283 bgcolor=#C2FFFF
| 437283 ||  || — || November 2, 2010 || Mount Lemmon || Mount Lemmon Survey || L4 || align=right | 7.7 km || 
|-id=284 bgcolor=#d6d6d6
| 437284 ||  || — || January 10, 2008 || Mount Lemmon || Mount Lemmon Survey || — || align=right | 2.7 km || 
|-id=285 bgcolor=#C2FFFF
| 437285 ||  || — || September 19, 2011 || Mount Lemmon || Mount Lemmon Survey || L4 || align=right | 12 km || 
|-id=286 bgcolor=#C2FFFF
| 437286 ||  || — || January 3, 2013 || Mount Lemmon || Mount Lemmon Survey || L4 || align=right | 9.2 km || 
|-id=287 bgcolor=#C2FFFF
| 437287 ||  || — || October 10, 2010 || Mount Lemmon || Mount Lemmon Survey || L4 || align=right | 9.1 km || 
|-id=288 bgcolor=#C2FFFF
| 437288 ||  || — || September 24, 2009 || Mount Lemmon || Mount Lemmon Survey || L4 || align=right | 7.3 km || 
|-id=289 bgcolor=#d6d6d6
| 437289 ||  || — || March 17, 2004 || Kitt Peak || Spacewatch || — || align=right | 2.5 km || 
|-id=290 bgcolor=#C2FFFF
| 437290 ||  || — || November 6, 2010 || Mount Lemmon || Mount Lemmon Survey || L4 || align=right | 7.9 km || 
|-id=291 bgcolor=#C2FFFF
| 437291 ||  || — || July 29, 2010 || WISE || WISE || L4 || align=right | 8.5 km || 
|-id=292 bgcolor=#C2FFFF
| 437292 ||  || — || January 16, 2013 || Mount Lemmon || Mount Lemmon Survey || L4 || align=right | 8.4 km || 
|-id=293 bgcolor=#d6d6d6
| 437293 ||  || — || September 23, 2011 || Catalina || CSS || — || align=right | 3.4 km || 
|-id=294 bgcolor=#C2FFFF
| 437294 ||  || — || November 3, 2010 || Mount Lemmon || Mount Lemmon Survey || L4 || align=right | 6.8 km || 
|-id=295 bgcolor=#C2FFFF
| 437295 ||  || — || December 7, 2012 || Mount Lemmon || Mount Lemmon Survey || L4 || align=right | 7.8 km || 
|-id=296 bgcolor=#C2FFFF
| 437296 ||  || — || January 5, 2013 || Kitt Peak || Spacewatch || L4 || align=right | 8.3 km || 
|-id=297 bgcolor=#d6d6d6
| 437297 ||  || — || November 13, 2006 || Catalina || CSS || — || align=right | 3.1 km || 
|-id=298 bgcolor=#C2FFFF
| 437298 ||  || — || October 28, 2010 || Mount Lemmon || Mount Lemmon Survey || L4 || align=right | 7.2 km || 
|-id=299 bgcolor=#d6d6d6
| 437299 ||  || — || October 18, 2011 || Catalina || CSS || — || align=right | 3.5 km || 
|-id=300 bgcolor=#C2FFFF
| 437300 ||  || — || January 10, 2013 || Kitt Peak || Spacewatch || L4 || align=right | 7.7 km || 
|}

437301–437400 

|-bgcolor=#C2FFFF
| 437301 ||  || — || October 13, 2007 || Mount Lemmon || Mount Lemmon Survey || L4 || align=right | 12 km || 
|-id=302 bgcolor=#C2FFFF
| 437302 ||  || — || November 25, 2010 || Mount Lemmon || Mount Lemmon Survey || L4 || align=right | 6.3 km || 
|-id=303 bgcolor=#d6d6d6
| 437303 ||  || — || May 29, 2010 || WISE || WISE || 7:4 || align=right | 3.4 km || 
|-id=304 bgcolor=#C2FFFF
| 437304 ||  || — || January 18, 2013 || Mount Lemmon || Mount Lemmon Survey || L4 || align=right | 7.9 km || 
|-id=305 bgcolor=#C2FFFF
| 437305 ||  || — || November 14, 2010 || Mount Lemmon || Mount Lemmon Survey || L4 || align=right | 7.0 km || 
|-id=306 bgcolor=#d6d6d6
| 437306 ||  || — || August 21, 2000 || Anderson Mesa || LONEOS || — || align=right | 3.4 km || 
|-id=307 bgcolor=#C2FFFF
| 437307 ||  || — || November 14, 2010 || Mount Lemmon || Mount Lemmon Survey || L4 || align=right | 7.0 km || 
|-id=308 bgcolor=#C2FFFF
| 437308 ||  || — || January 10, 2013 || Kitt Peak || Spacewatch || L4 || align=right | 7.1 km || 
|-id=309 bgcolor=#C2FFFF
| 437309 ||  || — || December 3, 2010 || Mount Lemmon || Mount Lemmon Survey || L4 || align=right | 8.0 km || 
|-id=310 bgcolor=#C2FFFF
| 437310 ||  || — || September 27, 2009 || Kitt Peak || Spacewatch || L4 || align=right | 6.7 km || 
|-id=311 bgcolor=#C2FFFF
| 437311 ||  || — || September 28, 2008 || Mount Lemmon || Mount Lemmon Survey || L4 || align=right | 7.5 km || 
|-id=312 bgcolor=#C2FFFF
| 437312 ||  || — || January 18, 2012 || Mount Lemmon || Mount Lemmon Survey || L4 || align=right | 8.2 km || 
|-id=313 bgcolor=#C7FF8F
| 437313 ||  || — || February 24, 2012 || Mount Lemmon || Mount Lemmon Survey || centaurcritical || align=right | 10 km || 
|-id=314 bgcolor=#C2FFFF
| 437314 ||  || — || November 17, 2009 || Mount Lemmon || Mount Lemmon Survey || L4 || align=right | 8.1 km || 
|-id=315 bgcolor=#E9E9E9
| 437315 ||  || — || April 23, 2007 || Kitt Peak || Spacewatch || — || align=right | 1.9 km || 
|-id=316 bgcolor=#FFC2E0
| 437316 ||  || — || July 16, 2013 || Haleakala || Pan-STARRS || APO || align=right data-sort-value="0.72" | 720 m || 
|-id=317 bgcolor=#fefefe
| 437317 ||  || — || August 29, 2000 || Socorro || LINEAR || H || align=right data-sort-value="0.80" | 800 m || 
|-id=318 bgcolor=#fefefe
| 437318 ||  || — || January 21, 2004 || Socorro || LINEAR || H || align=right data-sort-value="0.62" | 620 m || 
|-id=319 bgcolor=#fefefe
| 437319 ||  || — || December 17, 2003 || Kitt Peak || Spacewatch || H || align=right data-sort-value="0.62" | 620 m || 
|-id=320 bgcolor=#fefefe
| 437320 ||  || — || December 25, 2010 || Mount Lemmon || Mount Lemmon Survey || — || align=right | 1.1 km || 
|-id=321 bgcolor=#d6d6d6
| 437321 ||  || — || February 17, 2010 || Mount Lemmon || Mount Lemmon Survey || Tj (2.99) || align=right | 4.0 km || 
|-id=322 bgcolor=#fefefe
| 437322 ||  || — || June 10, 2013 || Mount Lemmon || Mount Lemmon Survey || H || align=right data-sort-value="0.77" | 770 m || 
|-id=323 bgcolor=#fefefe
| 437323 ||  || — || October 17, 2006 || Catalina || CSS || — || align=right data-sort-value="0.90" | 900 m || 
|-id=324 bgcolor=#fefefe
| 437324 ||  || — || November 27, 2011 || Mount Lemmon || Mount Lemmon Survey || H || align=right data-sort-value="0.82" | 820 m || 
|-id=325 bgcolor=#fefefe
| 437325 ||  || — || January 18, 2012 || Mount Lemmon || Mount Lemmon Survey || H || align=right data-sort-value="0.68" | 680 m || 
|-id=326 bgcolor=#fefefe
| 437326 ||  || — || February 13, 2007 || Socorro || LINEAR || H || align=right data-sort-value="0.70" | 700 m || 
|-id=327 bgcolor=#fefefe
| 437327 ||  || — || October 1, 2005 || Catalina || CSS || H || align=right data-sort-value="0.66" | 660 m || 
|-id=328 bgcolor=#fefefe
| 437328 ||  || — || September 1, 2005 || Anderson Mesa || LONEOS || H || align=right data-sort-value="0.50" | 500 m || 
|-id=329 bgcolor=#fefefe
| 437329 ||  || — || February 26, 2011 || Mount Lemmon || Mount Lemmon Survey || NYS || align=right data-sort-value="0.62" | 620 m || 
|-id=330 bgcolor=#fefefe
| 437330 ||  || — || October 23, 2006 || Mount Lemmon || Mount Lemmon Survey || MAS || align=right data-sort-value="0.75" | 750 m || 
|-id=331 bgcolor=#E9E9E9
| 437331 ||  || — || March 28, 2011 || Mount Lemmon || Mount Lemmon Survey || AGN || align=right | 1.2 km || 
|-id=332 bgcolor=#fefefe
| 437332 ||  || — || September 23, 2000 || Anderson Mesa || LONEOS || — || align=right data-sort-value="0.77" | 770 m || 
|-id=333 bgcolor=#fefefe
| 437333 ||  || — || February 3, 2008 || Kitt Peak || Spacewatch || — || align=right data-sort-value="0.74" | 740 m || 
|-id=334 bgcolor=#d6d6d6
| 437334 ||  || — || September 14, 2013 || Kitt Peak || Spacewatch || THB || align=right | 2.8 km || 
|-id=335 bgcolor=#FA8072
| 437335 ||  || — || October 17, 2003 || Anderson Mesa || LONEOS || H || align=right data-sort-value="0.54" | 540 m || 
|-id=336 bgcolor=#d6d6d6
| 437336 ||  || — || October 12, 2007 || Mount Lemmon || Mount Lemmon Survey || — || align=right | 2.7 km || 
|-id=337 bgcolor=#fefefe
| 437337 ||  || — || March 15, 2004 || Catalina || CSS || — || align=right data-sort-value="0.98" | 980 m || 
|-id=338 bgcolor=#fefefe
| 437338 ||  || — || September 21, 2003 || Kitt Peak || Spacewatch || H || align=right data-sort-value="0.45" | 450 m || 
|-id=339 bgcolor=#fefefe
| 437339 ||  || — || April 20, 2007 || Mount Lemmon || Mount Lemmon Survey || H || align=right data-sort-value="0.64" | 640 m || 
|-id=340 bgcolor=#fefefe
| 437340 ||  || — || November 19, 2006 || Kitt Peak || Spacewatch || — || align=right data-sort-value="0.77" | 770 m || 
|-id=341 bgcolor=#fefefe
| 437341 ||  || — || November 6, 2010 || Mount Lemmon || Mount Lemmon Survey || — || align=right data-sort-value="0.71" | 710 m || 
|-id=342 bgcolor=#fefefe
| 437342 ||  || — || December 4, 2010 || Mount Lemmon || Mount Lemmon Survey || — || align=right data-sort-value="0.69" | 690 m || 
|-id=343 bgcolor=#fefefe
| 437343 ||  || — || October 31, 2006 || Kitt Peak || Spacewatch || — || align=right data-sort-value="0.62" | 620 m || 
|-id=344 bgcolor=#E9E9E9
| 437344 ||  || — || February 15, 2010 || WISE || WISE || — || align=right | 1.1 km || 
|-id=345 bgcolor=#fefefe
| 437345 ||  || — || November 13, 2010 || Kitt Peak || Spacewatch || — || align=right data-sort-value="0.70" | 700 m || 
|-id=346 bgcolor=#d6d6d6
| 437346 ||  || — || October 2, 2013 || Mount Lemmon || Mount Lemmon Survey || — || align=right | 2.5 km || 
|-id=347 bgcolor=#fefefe
| 437347 ||  || — || February 13, 2011 || Mount Lemmon || Mount Lemmon Survey || — || align=right data-sort-value="0.83" | 830 m || 
|-id=348 bgcolor=#fefefe
| 437348 ||  || — || March 12, 2007 || Mount Lemmon || Mount Lemmon Survey || H || align=right data-sort-value="0.74" | 740 m || 
|-id=349 bgcolor=#d6d6d6
| 437349 ||  || — || October 22, 2003 || Kitt Peak || Spacewatch || — || align=right | 2.0 km || 
|-id=350 bgcolor=#fefefe
| 437350 ||  || — || February 10, 2011 || Catalina || CSS || NYS || align=right data-sort-value="0.77" | 770 m || 
|-id=351 bgcolor=#fefefe
| 437351 ||  || — || September 21, 2003 || Kitt Peak || Spacewatch || — || align=right data-sort-value="0.65" | 650 m || 
|-id=352 bgcolor=#fefefe
| 437352 ||  || — || November 8, 2007 || Mount Lemmon || Mount Lemmon Survey || — || align=right data-sort-value="0.55" | 550 m || 
|-id=353 bgcolor=#fefefe
| 437353 ||  || — || October 4, 1997 || Kitt Peak || Spacewatch || — || align=right data-sort-value="0.60" | 600 m || 
|-id=354 bgcolor=#fefefe
| 437354 ||  || — || September 20, 2006 || Catalina || CSS || — || align=right data-sort-value="0.84" | 840 m || 
|-id=355 bgcolor=#fefefe
| 437355 ||  || — || January 11, 2008 || Kitt Peak || Spacewatch || — || align=right data-sort-value="0.67" | 670 m || 
|-id=356 bgcolor=#d6d6d6
| 437356 ||  || — || June 13, 2010 || WISE || WISE || — || align=right | 3.7 km || 
|-id=357 bgcolor=#E9E9E9
| 437357 ||  || — || October 27, 2005 || Mount Lemmon || Mount Lemmon Survey || — || align=right data-sort-value="0.86" | 860 m || 
|-id=358 bgcolor=#fefefe
| 437358 ||  || — || August 29, 2009 || Kitt Peak || Spacewatch || — || align=right data-sort-value="0.73" | 730 m || 
|-id=359 bgcolor=#fefefe
| 437359 ||  || — || August 29, 2006 || Catalina || CSS || — || align=right data-sort-value="0.75" | 750 m || 
|-id=360 bgcolor=#C2E0FF
| 437360 ||  || — || August 12, 2013 || Haleakala || Pan-STARRS || SDO || align=right | 233 km || 
|-id=361 bgcolor=#fefefe
| 437361 ||  || — || October 7, 2005 || Mount Lemmon || Mount Lemmon Survey || H || align=right data-sort-value="0.67" | 670 m || 
|-id=362 bgcolor=#fefefe
| 437362 ||  || — || February 18, 2012 || Catalina || CSS || H || align=right data-sort-value="0.64" | 640 m || 
|-id=363 bgcolor=#fefefe
| 437363 ||  || — || December 5, 2000 || Socorro || LINEAR || — || align=right | 1.1 km || 
|-id=364 bgcolor=#fefefe
| 437364 ||  || — || October 29, 2008 || Kitt Peak || Spacewatch || H || align=right data-sort-value="0.66" | 660 m || 
|-id=365 bgcolor=#E9E9E9
| 437365 ||  || — || September 27, 2000 || Socorro || LINEAR || JUN || align=right | 1.2 km || 
|-id=366 bgcolor=#E9E9E9
| 437366 ||  || — || November 20, 2000 || Socorro || LINEAR || JUN || align=right | 1.2 km || 
|-id=367 bgcolor=#E9E9E9
| 437367 ||  || — || December 22, 2005 || Catalina || CSS || — || align=right | 1.3 km || 
|-id=368 bgcolor=#fefefe
| 437368 ||  || — || December 20, 2003 || Socorro || LINEAR || — || align=right data-sort-value="0.70" | 700 m || 
|-id=369 bgcolor=#d6d6d6
| 437369 ||  || — || December 5, 2002 || Socorro || LINEAR || — || align=right | 3.2 km || 
|-id=370 bgcolor=#E9E9E9
| 437370 ||  || — || February 25, 2011 || Mount Lemmon || Mount Lemmon Survey || — || align=right | 1.2 km || 
|-id=371 bgcolor=#fefefe
| 437371 ||  || — || September 6, 2005 || Siding Spring || SSS || H || align=right data-sort-value="0.74" | 740 m || 
|-id=372 bgcolor=#E9E9E9
| 437372 ||  || — || March 4, 2010 || WISE || WISE || KON || align=right | 2.3 km || 
|-id=373 bgcolor=#E9E9E9
| 437373 ||  || — || January 12, 2010 || Catalina || CSS || RAF || align=right | 1.1 km || 
|-id=374 bgcolor=#fefefe
| 437374 ||  || — || April 15, 2012 || Catalina || CSS || — || align=right data-sort-value="0.94" | 940 m || 
|-id=375 bgcolor=#fefefe
| 437375 ||  || — || March 14, 2007 || Mount Lemmon || Mount Lemmon Survey || — || align=right data-sort-value="0.94" | 940 m || 
|-id=376 bgcolor=#d6d6d6
| 437376 ||  || — || September 29, 2008 || Kitt Peak || Spacewatch || — || align=right | 3.7 km || 
|-id=377 bgcolor=#fefefe
| 437377 ||  || — || January 2, 2011 || Mount Lemmon || Mount Lemmon Survey || — || align=right data-sort-value="0.85" | 850 m || 
|-id=378 bgcolor=#E9E9E9
| 437378 ||  || — || September 12, 2004 || Socorro || LINEAR || — || align=right | 2.7 km || 
|-id=379 bgcolor=#fefefe
| 437379 ||  || — || January 22, 2004 || Socorro || LINEAR || — || align=right data-sort-value="0.82" | 820 m || 
|-id=380 bgcolor=#E9E9E9
| 437380 ||  || — || May 1, 2003 || Kitt Peak || Spacewatch || — || align=right | 1.1 km || 
|-id=381 bgcolor=#fefefe
| 437381 ||  || — || November 11, 2007 || Mount Lemmon || Mount Lemmon Survey || — || align=right | 1.0 km || 
|-id=382 bgcolor=#fefefe
| 437382 ||  || — || April 4, 2008 || Kitt Peak || Spacewatch || — || align=right data-sort-value="0.68" | 680 m || 
|-id=383 bgcolor=#fefefe
| 437383 ||  || — || November 23, 2006 || Kitt Peak || Spacewatch || — || align=right data-sort-value="0.62" | 620 m || 
|-id=384 bgcolor=#E9E9E9
| 437384 ||  || — || December 15, 2009 || Mount Lemmon || Mount Lemmon Survey || — || align=right | 2.3 km || 
|-id=385 bgcolor=#d6d6d6
| 437385 ||  || — || May 22, 2011 || Mount Lemmon || Mount Lemmon Survey || EOS || align=right | 2.4 km || 
|-id=386 bgcolor=#fefefe
| 437386 ||  || — || May 7, 2008 || Kitt Peak || Spacewatch || — || align=right data-sort-value="0.89" | 890 m || 
|-id=387 bgcolor=#fefefe
| 437387 ||  || — || December 26, 2006 || Kitt Peak || Spacewatch || — || align=right | 1.0 km || 
|-id=388 bgcolor=#E9E9E9
| 437388 ||  || — || October 5, 2004 || Kitt Peak || Spacewatch || — || align=right | 1.2 km || 
|-id=389 bgcolor=#E9E9E9
| 437389 ||  || — || March 27, 2011 || Mount Lemmon || Mount Lemmon Survey || — || align=right | 1.1 km || 
|-id=390 bgcolor=#fefefe
| 437390 ||  || — || July 6, 2005 || Kitt Peak || Spacewatch || — || align=right data-sort-value="0.87" | 870 m || 
|-id=391 bgcolor=#E9E9E9
| 437391 ||  || — || September 25, 1995 || Kitt Peak || Spacewatch || JUN || align=right data-sort-value="0.99" | 990 m || 
|-id=392 bgcolor=#fefefe
| 437392 ||  || — || September 15, 2009 || Kitt Peak || Spacewatch || — || align=right data-sort-value="0.82" | 820 m || 
|-id=393 bgcolor=#fefefe
| 437393 ||  || — || March 31, 2012 || Mount Lemmon || Mount Lemmon Survey || H || align=right data-sort-value="0.77" | 770 m || 
|-id=394 bgcolor=#fefefe
| 437394 ||  || — || December 30, 2007 || Kitt Peak || Spacewatch || — || align=right data-sort-value="0.66" | 660 m || 
|-id=395 bgcolor=#E9E9E9
| 437395 ||  || — || November 26, 2000 || Socorro || LINEAR || ADE || align=right | 3.4 km || 
|-id=396 bgcolor=#fefefe
| 437396 ||  || — || April 12, 2004 || Catalina || CSS || — || align=right | 1.1 km || 
|-id=397 bgcolor=#E9E9E9
| 437397 ||  || — || November 9, 1999 || Socorro || LINEAR || DOR || align=right | 2.2 km || 
|-id=398 bgcolor=#E9E9E9
| 437398 ||  || — || November 10, 2009 || Mount Lemmon || Mount Lemmon Survey || — || align=right | 1.4 km || 
|-id=399 bgcolor=#E9E9E9
| 437399 ||  || — || October 24, 2013 || Catalina || CSS || EUN || align=right | 1.4 km || 
|-id=400 bgcolor=#fefefe
| 437400 ||  || — || November 17, 1995 || Kitt Peak || Spacewatch || — || align=right data-sort-value="0.82" | 820 m || 
|}

437401–437500 

|-bgcolor=#d6d6d6
| 437401 ||  || — || September 19, 2007 || Kitt Peak || Spacewatch || — || align=right | 2.8 km || 
|-id=402 bgcolor=#fefefe
| 437402 ||  || — || October 23, 2006 || Mount Lemmon || Mount Lemmon Survey || — || align=right data-sort-value="0.91" | 910 m || 
|-id=403 bgcolor=#fefefe
| 437403 ||  || — || February 8, 2007 || Mount Lemmon || Mount Lemmon Survey || — || align=right | 1.2 km || 
|-id=404 bgcolor=#E9E9E9
| 437404 ||  || — || November 21, 2009 || Kitt Peak || Spacewatch || — || align=right | 3.1 km || 
|-id=405 bgcolor=#E9E9E9
| 437405 ||  || — || December 14, 2004 || Socorro || LINEAR || ADE || align=right | 2.2 km || 
|-id=406 bgcolor=#fefefe
| 437406 ||  || — || April 7, 2011 || Kitt Peak || Spacewatch || — || align=right data-sort-value="0.84" | 840 m || 
|-id=407 bgcolor=#E9E9E9
| 437407 ||  || — || August 20, 2000 || Kitt Peak || Spacewatch || — || align=right data-sort-value="0.96" | 960 m || 
|-id=408 bgcolor=#fefefe
| 437408 ||  || — || September 25, 2009 || Mount Lemmon || Mount Lemmon Survey || — || align=right data-sort-value="0.91" | 910 m || 
|-id=409 bgcolor=#fefefe
| 437409 ||  || — || December 27, 2006 || Mount Lemmon || Mount Lemmon Survey || — || align=right | 1.2 km || 
|-id=410 bgcolor=#fefefe
| 437410 ||  || — || February 9, 2007 || Catalina || CSS || — || align=right data-sort-value="0.89" | 890 m || 
|-id=411 bgcolor=#fefefe
| 437411 ||  || — || September 30, 2009 || Mount Lemmon || Mount Lemmon Survey || V || align=right data-sort-value="0.65" | 650 m || 
|-id=412 bgcolor=#fefefe
| 437412 ||  || — || September 18, 2009 || Kitt Peak || Spacewatch || — || align=right data-sort-value="0.65" | 650 m || 
|-id=413 bgcolor=#E9E9E9
| 437413 ||  || — || November 17, 2009 || Kitt Peak || Spacewatch || — || align=right data-sort-value="0.79" | 790 m || 
|-id=414 bgcolor=#fefefe
| 437414 ||  || — || April 21, 2004 || Kitt Peak || Spacewatch || — || align=right data-sort-value="0.95" | 950 m || 
|-id=415 bgcolor=#d6d6d6
| 437415 ||  || — || February 13, 2010 || WISE || WISE || — || align=right | 3.7 km || 
|-id=416 bgcolor=#fefefe
| 437416 ||  || — || October 24, 2003 || Kitt Peak || Spacewatch || — || align=right data-sort-value="0.79" | 790 m || 
|-id=417 bgcolor=#d6d6d6
| 437417 ||  || — || October 8, 2007 || Mount Lemmon || Mount Lemmon Survey || — || align=right | 2.4 km || 
|-id=418 bgcolor=#E9E9E9
| 437418 ||  || — || November 12, 2013 || XuYi || PMO NEO || — || align=right | 1.3 km || 
|-id=419 bgcolor=#E9E9E9
| 437419 ||  || — || April 24, 2011 || Kitt Peak || Spacewatch || — || align=right | 2.1 km || 
|-id=420 bgcolor=#E9E9E9
| 437420 ||  || — || October 15, 2013 || Catalina || CSS || EUN || align=right | 1.4 km || 
|-id=421 bgcolor=#E9E9E9
| 437421 ||  || — || February 13, 2010 || Catalina || CSS || — || align=right | 2.5 km || 
|-id=422 bgcolor=#fefefe
| 437422 ||  || — || January 10, 2007 || Kitt Peak || Spacewatch || — || align=right data-sort-value="0.76" | 760 m || 
|-id=423 bgcolor=#E9E9E9
| 437423 ||  || — || November 3, 2008 || Mount Lemmon || Mount Lemmon Survey || — || align=right | 2.4 km || 
|-id=424 bgcolor=#E9E9E9
| 437424 ||  || — || May 23, 2003 || Kitt Peak || Spacewatch || — || align=right | 1.2 km || 
|-id=425 bgcolor=#d6d6d6
| 437425 ||  || — || January 11, 2008 || Mount Lemmon || Mount Lemmon Survey || — || align=right | 4.4 km || 
|-id=426 bgcolor=#E9E9E9
| 437426 ||  || — || February 13, 2010 || Catalina || CSS || — || align=right | 2.5 km || 
|-id=427 bgcolor=#d6d6d6
| 437427 ||  || — || April 18, 2009 || Kitt Peak || Spacewatch || 7:4* || align=right | 4.2 km || 
|-id=428 bgcolor=#E9E9E9
| 437428 ||  || — || September 8, 2008 || Siding Spring || SSS || — || align=right | 3.3 km || 
|-id=429 bgcolor=#E9E9E9
| 437429 ||  || — || October 10, 2008 || Mount Lemmon || Mount Lemmon Survey || — || align=right | 2.4 km || 
|-id=430 bgcolor=#d6d6d6
| 437430 ||  || — || May 8, 2005 || Kitt Peak || Spacewatch || EOS || align=right | 2.0 km || 
|-id=431 bgcolor=#fefefe
| 437431 ||  || — || December 24, 2006 || Mount Lemmon || Mount Lemmon Survey || — || align=right | 1.0 km || 
|-id=432 bgcolor=#E9E9E9
| 437432 ||  || — || September 20, 2008 || Catalina || CSS || — || align=right | 1.8 km || 
|-id=433 bgcolor=#fefefe
| 437433 ||  || — || October 18, 2009 || Catalina || CSS || — || align=right data-sort-value="0.92" | 920 m || 
|-id=434 bgcolor=#fefefe
| 437434 ||  || — || December 24, 2006 || Kitt Peak || Spacewatch || — || align=right data-sort-value="0.74" | 740 m || 
|-id=435 bgcolor=#E9E9E9
| 437435 ||  || — || January 28, 2006 || Catalina || CSS || — || align=right | 2.0 km || 
|-id=436 bgcolor=#d6d6d6
| 437436 ||  || — || February 4, 2009 || Mount Lemmon || Mount Lemmon Survey || — || align=right | 2.3 km || 
|-id=437 bgcolor=#d6d6d6
| 437437 ||  || — || January 18, 2009 || Kitt Peak || Spacewatch || — || align=right | 2.4 km || 
|-id=438 bgcolor=#E9E9E9
| 437438 ||  || — || September 24, 2008 || Kitt Peak || Spacewatch || — || align=right | 2.1 km || 
|-id=439 bgcolor=#d6d6d6
| 437439 ||  || — || January 18, 2009 || Kitt Peak || Spacewatch || — || align=right | 2.3 km || 
|-id=440 bgcolor=#E9E9E9
| 437440 ||  || — || March 14, 2010 || Catalina || CSS || — || align=right | 2.1 km || 
|-id=441 bgcolor=#E9E9E9
| 437441 ||  || — || September 24, 2008 || Mount Lemmon || Mount Lemmon Survey || — || align=right | 1.6 km || 
|-id=442 bgcolor=#E9E9E9
| 437442 ||  || — || September 4, 2008 || Kitt Peak || Spacewatch || — || align=right | 1.6 km || 
|-id=443 bgcolor=#d6d6d6
| 437443 ||  || — || October 28, 2013 || Mount Lemmon || Mount Lemmon Survey || — || align=right | 2.9 km || 
|-id=444 bgcolor=#d6d6d6
| 437444 ||  || — || January 1, 2009 || Kitt Peak || Spacewatch || — || align=right | 3.2 km || 
|-id=445 bgcolor=#d6d6d6
| 437445 ||  || — || March 11, 2005 || Mount Lemmon || Mount Lemmon Survey || KOR || align=right | 1.3 km || 
|-id=446 bgcolor=#fefefe
| 437446 ||  || — || November 16, 2006 || Mount Lemmon || Mount Lemmon Survey || — || align=right data-sort-value="0.75" | 750 m || 
|-id=447 bgcolor=#d6d6d6
| 437447 ||  || — || May 12, 2010 || Mount Lemmon || Mount Lemmon Survey || VER || align=right | 3.0 km || 
|-id=448 bgcolor=#d6d6d6
| 437448 ||  || — || July 3, 2011 || Mount Lemmon || Mount Lemmon Survey || — || align=right | 3.1 km || 
|-id=449 bgcolor=#d6d6d6
| 437449 ||  || — || September 14, 2007 || Mount Lemmon || Mount Lemmon Survey || — || align=right | 2.1 km || 
|-id=450 bgcolor=#d6d6d6
| 437450 ||  || — || November 2, 2007 || Mount Lemmon || Mount Lemmon Survey || — || align=right | 2.5 km || 
|-id=451 bgcolor=#d6d6d6
| 437451 ||  || — || July 1, 2005 || Kitt Peak || Spacewatch || — || align=right | 3.5 km || 
|-id=452 bgcolor=#E9E9E9
| 437452 ||  || — || September 23, 2008 || Kitt Peak || Spacewatch || MRX || align=right | 1.0 km || 
|-id=453 bgcolor=#d6d6d6
| 437453 ||  || — || June 26, 2011 || Mount Lemmon || Mount Lemmon Survey || — || align=right | 3.2 km || 
|-id=454 bgcolor=#fefefe
| 437454 ||  || — || February 9, 2008 || Mount Lemmon || Mount Lemmon Survey || — || align=right data-sort-value="0.75" | 750 m || 
|-id=455 bgcolor=#fefefe
| 437455 ||  || — || April 6, 2011 || Mount Lemmon || Mount Lemmon Survey || — || align=right data-sort-value="0.96" | 960 m || 
|-id=456 bgcolor=#E9E9E9
| 437456 ||  || — || February 1, 2005 || Kitt Peak || Spacewatch || — || align=right | 2.3 km || 
|-id=457 bgcolor=#fefefe
| 437457 ||  || — || March 15, 2008 || Mount Lemmon || Mount Lemmon Survey || — || align=right data-sort-value="0.88" | 880 m || 
|-id=458 bgcolor=#E9E9E9
| 437458 ||  || — || February 13, 2001 || Kitt Peak || Spacewatch || — || align=right | 1.4 km || 
|-id=459 bgcolor=#E9E9E9
| 437459 ||  || — || January 31, 2006 || Kitt Peak || Spacewatch || — || align=right | 1.1 km || 
|-id=460 bgcolor=#E9E9E9
| 437460 ||  || — || September 1, 2008 || Siding Spring || SSS || — || align=right | 2.9 km || 
|-id=461 bgcolor=#fefefe
| 437461 ||  || — || December 21, 2006 || Kitt Peak || Spacewatch || — || align=right data-sort-value="0.68" | 680 m || 
|-id=462 bgcolor=#d6d6d6
| 437462 ||  || — || November 15, 2007 || Mount Lemmon || Mount Lemmon Survey || LIX || align=right | 3.1 km || 
|-id=463 bgcolor=#E9E9E9
| 437463 ||  || — || November 3, 2008 || Mount Lemmon || Mount Lemmon Survey || — || align=right | 2.3 km || 
|-id=464 bgcolor=#d6d6d6
| 437464 ||  || — || January 27, 2003 || Socorro || LINEAR || — || align=right | 3.2 km || 
|-id=465 bgcolor=#E9E9E9
| 437465 ||  || — || June 15, 2010 || WISE || WISE || — || align=right | 2.5 km || 
|-id=466 bgcolor=#d6d6d6
| 437466 ||  || — || February 4, 2009 || Mount Lemmon || Mount Lemmon Survey || EOS || align=right | 2.3 km || 
|-id=467 bgcolor=#d6d6d6
| 437467 ||  || — || February 1, 2009 || Mount Lemmon || Mount Lemmon Survey || EOS || align=right | 2.4 km || 
|-id=468 bgcolor=#fefefe
| 437468 ||  || — || January 27, 2007 || Kitt Peak || Spacewatch || V || align=right data-sort-value="0.73" | 730 m || 
|-id=469 bgcolor=#d6d6d6
| 437469 ||  || — || November 17, 2007 || Kitt Peak || Spacewatch || — || align=right | 2.8 km || 
|-id=470 bgcolor=#E9E9E9
| 437470 ||  || — || June 24, 2012 || Mount Lemmon || Mount Lemmon Survey || — || align=right | 2.4 km || 
|-id=471 bgcolor=#E9E9E9
| 437471 ||  || — || December 18, 2009 || Kitt Peak || Spacewatch || — || align=right | 1.8 km || 
|-id=472 bgcolor=#d6d6d6
| 437472 ||  || — || January 31, 2009 || Mount Lemmon || Mount Lemmon Survey || — || align=right | 2.6 km || 
|-id=473 bgcolor=#d6d6d6
| 437473 ||  || — || September 9, 2007 || Mount Lemmon || Mount Lemmon Survey || — || align=right | 2.2 km || 
|-id=474 bgcolor=#E9E9E9
| 437474 ||  || — || October 2, 2008 || Kitt Peak || Spacewatch || — || align=right | 1.6 km || 
|-id=475 bgcolor=#d6d6d6
| 437475 ||  || — || January 16, 2009 || Kitt Peak || Spacewatch || — || align=right | 2.9 km || 
|-id=476 bgcolor=#d6d6d6
| 437476 ||  || — || November 13, 2007 || Mount Lemmon || Mount Lemmon Survey || — || align=right | 2.7 km || 
|-id=477 bgcolor=#E9E9E9
| 437477 ||  || — || November 3, 2004 || Kitt Peak || Spacewatch || MIS || align=right | 1.7 km || 
|-id=478 bgcolor=#E9E9E9
| 437478 ||  || — || August 22, 1995 || Kitt Peak || Spacewatch || — || align=right | 1.6 km || 
|-id=479 bgcolor=#E9E9E9
| 437479 ||  || — || February 13, 2010 || Mount Lemmon || Mount Lemmon Survey || — || align=right | 1.2 km || 
|-id=480 bgcolor=#fefefe
| 437480 ||  || — || November 17, 2009 || Mount Lemmon || Mount Lemmon Survey || NYS || align=right data-sort-value="0.64" | 640 m || 
|-id=481 bgcolor=#d6d6d6
| 437481 ||  || — || March 1, 2009 || Catalina || CSS || — || align=right | 2.5 km || 
|-id=482 bgcolor=#fefefe
| 437482 ||  || — || October 21, 2006 || Mount Lemmon || Mount Lemmon Survey || — || align=right data-sort-value="0.75" | 750 m || 
|-id=483 bgcolor=#E9E9E9
| 437483 ||  || — || February 17, 2010 || Catalina || CSS || — || align=right | 2.3 km || 
|-id=484 bgcolor=#E9E9E9
| 437484 ||  || — || March 20, 2010 || Mount Lemmon || Mount Lemmon Survey || — || align=right | 2.3 km || 
|-id=485 bgcolor=#E9E9E9
| 437485 ||  || — || January 12, 2010 || Kitt Peak || Spacewatch || — || align=right | 2.2 km || 
|-id=486 bgcolor=#E9E9E9
| 437486 ||  || — || May 26, 2003 || Kitt Peak || Spacewatch || — || align=right | 1.3 km || 
|-id=487 bgcolor=#E9E9E9
| 437487 ||  || — || September 22, 2008 || Mount Lemmon || Mount Lemmon Survey || — || align=right | 2.1 km || 
|-id=488 bgcolor=#fefefe
| 437488 ||  || — || October 6, 2005 || Kitt Peak || Spacewatch || — || align=right data-sort-value="0.70" | 700 m || 
|-id=489 bgcolor=#d6d6d6
| 437489 ||  || — || October 31, 2008 || Mount Lemmon || Mount Lemmon Survey || — || align=right | 3.1 km || 
|-id=490 bgcolor=#E9E9E9
| 437490 ||  || — || January 10, 2010 || Socorro || LINEAR || — || align=right | 1.5 km || 
|-id=491 bgcolor=#E9E9E9
| 437491 ||  || — || October 7, 2008 || Mount Lemmon || Mount Lemmon Survey || WIT || align=right | 1.0 km || 
|-id=492 bgcolor=#E9E9E9
| 437492 ||  || — || March 25, 2006 || Kitt Peak || Spacewatch || — || align=right | 1.5 km || 
|-id=493 bgcolor=#E9E9E9
| 437493 ||  || — || February 13, 2010 || Mount Lemmon || Mount Lemmon Survey || — || align=right | 1.8 km || 
|-id=494 bgcolor=#E9E9E9
| 437494 ||  || — || December 2, 2004 || Kitt Peak || Spacewatch || — || align=right | 2.2 km || 
|-id=495 bgcolor=#fefefe
| 437495 ||  || — || September 28, 2009 || Mount Lemmon || Mount Lemmon Survey || V || align=right data-sort-value="0.67" | 670 m || 
|-id=496 bgcolor=#E9E9E9
| 437496 ||  || — || March 18, 2010 || Mount Lemmon || Mount Lemmon Survey || — || align=right | 2.1 km || 
|-id=497 bgcolor=#fefefe
| 437497 ||  || — || November 13, 2010 || Kitt Peak || Spacewatch || — || align=right data-sort-value="0.72" | 720 m || 
|-id=498 bgcolor=#d6d6d6
| 437498 ||  || — || March 27, 2004 || Socorro || LINEAR || — || align=right | 3.1 km || 
|-id=499 bgcolor=#d6d6d6
| 437499 ||  || — || June 8, 2010 || WISE || WISE || — || align=right | 4.4 km || 
|-id=500 bgcolor=#E9E9E9
| 437500 ||  || — || January 15, 2005 || Kitt Peak || Spacewatch || — || align=right | 2.5 km || 
|}

437501–437600 

|-bgcolor=#d6d6d6
| 437501 ||  || — || November 14, 2007 || Mount Lemmon || Mount Lemmon Survey || — || align=right | 3.1 km || 
|-id=502 bgcolor=#E9E9E9
| 437502 ||  || — || May 2, 2006 || Mount Lemmon || Mount Lemmon Survey || — || align=right | 3.0 km || 
|-id=503 bgcolor=#E9E9E9
| 437503 ||  || — || November 17, 2009 || Kitt Peak || Spacewatch || EUN || align=right | 1.2 km || 
|-id=504 bgcolor=#d6d6d6
| 437504 ||  || — || December 4, 2008 || Kitt Peak || Spacewatch || — || align=right | 2.3 km || 
|-id=505 bgcolor=#d6d6d6
| 437505 ||  || — || December 24, 2013 || Mount Lemmon || Mount Lemmon Survey || VER || align=right | 2.7 km || 
|-id=506 bgcolor=#E9E9E9
| 437506 ||  || — || January 25, 2006 || Kitt Peak || Spacewatch || — || align=right data-sort-value="0.79" | 790 m || 
|-id=507 bgcolor=#E9E9E9
| 437507 ||  || — || December 16, 2004 || Kitt Peak || Spacewatch || — || align=right | 2.6 km || 
|-id=508 bgcolor=#E9E9E9
| 437508 ||  || — || September 4, 2008 || Kitt Peak || Spacewatch || — || align=right | 2.9 km || 
|-id=509 bgcolor=#E9E9E9
| 437509 ||  || — || October 29, 2008 || Kitt Peak || Spacewatch || — || align=right | 2.1 km || 
|-id=510 bgcolor=#E9E9E9
| 437510 ||  || — || October 6, 2008 || Mount Lemmon || Mount Lemmon Survey || — || align=right | 1.6 km || 
|-id=511 bgcolor=#d6d6d6
| 437511 ||  || — || December 22, 2008 || Kitt Peak || Spacewatch || — || align=right | 2.9 km || 
|-id=512 bgcolor=#d6d6d6
| 437512 ||  || — || January 29, 2009 || Kitt Peak || Spacewatch || — || align=right | 2.2 km || 
|-id=513 bgcolor=#E9E9E9
| 437513 ||  || — || October 7, 2008 || Mount Lemmon || Mount Lemmon Survey || — || align=right | 1.8 km || 
|-id=514 bgcolor=#E9E9E9
| 437514 ||  || — || August 10, 2007 || Kitt Peak || Spacewatch || — || align=right | 2.3 km || 
|-id=515 bgcolor=#E9E9E9
| 437515 ||  || — || October 23, 2008 || Kitt Peak || Spacewatch || — || align=right | 1.3 km || 
|-id=516 bgcolor=#E9E9E9
| 437516 ||  || — || July 20, 2012 || Siding Spring || SSS || — || align=right | 3.1 km || 
|-id=517 bgcolor=#d6d6d6
| 437517 ||  || — || October 11, 2012 || Mount Lemmon || Mount Lemmon Survey || — || align=right | 2.3 km || 
|-id=518 bgcolor=#d6d6d6
| 437518 ||  || — || August 19, 2006 || Kitt Peak || Spacewatch || — || align=right | 2.7 km || 
|-id=519 bgcolor=#fefefe
| 437519 ||  || — || August 21, 2008 || Kitt Peak || Spacewatch || — || align=right data-sort-value="0.98" | 980 m || 
|-id=520 bgcolor=#fefefe
| 437520 ||  || — || April 2, 2011 || Kitt Peak || Spacewatch || — || align=right data-sort-value="0.92" | 920 m || 
|-id=521 bgcolor=#E9E9E9
| 437521 ||  || — || February 24, 2006 || Catalina || CSS || EUN || align=right | 1.4 km || 
|-id=522 bgcolor=#fefefe
| 437522 ||  || — || November 26, 2013 || Mount Lemmon || Mount Lemmon Survey || — || align=right | 1.1 km || 
|-id=523 bgcolor=#d6d6d6
| 437523 ||  || — || February 19, 2009 || Mount Lemmon || Mount Lemmon Survey || EOS || align=right | 2.6 km || 
|-id=524 bgcolor=#d6d6d6
| 437524 ||  || — || December 10, 2005 || Kitt Peak || Spacewatch || 3:2 || align=right | 3.9 km || 
|-id=525 bgcolor=#E9E9E9
| 437525 ||  || — || October 26, 2008 || Mount Lemmon || Mount Lemmon Survey || NEM || align=right | 2.4 km || 
|-id=526 bgcolor=#E9E9E9
| 437526 ||  || — || May 22, 2011 || Mount Lemmon || Mount Lemmon Survey || — || align=right | 1.6 km || 
|-id=527 bgcolor=#E9E9E9
| 437527 ||  || — || September 24, 2008 || Mount Lemmon || Mount Lemmon Survey || — || align=right | 2.1 km || 
|-id=528 bgcolor=#E9E9E9
| 437528 ||  || — || October 29, 2008 || Kitt Peak || Spacewatch || AGN || align=right data-sort-value="0.95" | 950 m || 
|-id=529 bgcolor=#E9E9E9
| 437529 ||  || — || May 24, 2006 || Catalina || CSS || — || align=right | 3.8 km || 
|-id=530 bgcolor=#E9E9E9
| 437530 ||  || — || May 2, 1997 || Kitt Peak || Spacewatch || NEM || align=right | 2.6 km || 
|-id=531 bgcolor=#d6d6d6
| 437531 ||  || — || July 8, 2005 || Kitt Peak || Spacewatch || — || align=right | 2.8 km || 
|-id=532 bgcolor=#E9E9E9
| 437532 ||  || — || November 11, 2009 || Mount Lemmon || Mount Lemmon Survey || — || align=right | 1.1 km || 
|-id=533 bgcolor=#E9E9E9
| 437533 ||  || — || January 7, 2010 || Kitt Peak || Spacewatch || — || align=right | 1.0 km || 
|-id=534 bgcolor=#E9E9E9
| 437534 ||  || — || February 4, 2005 || Kitt Peak || Spacewatch || — || align=right | 2.6 km || 
|-id=535 bgcolor=#E9E9E9
| 437535 ||  || — || December 21, 2008 || Mount Lemmon || Mount Lemmon Survey || — || align=right | 3.0 km || 
|-id=536 bgcolor=#E9E9E9
| 437536 ||  || — || March 20, 2010 || Mount Lemmon || Mount Lemmon Survey || — || align=right | 2.3 km || 
|-id=537 bgcolor=#E9E9E9
| 437537 ||  || — || October 21, 2008 || Mount Lemmon || Mount Lemmon Survey || — || align=right | 1.1 km || 
|-id=538 bgcolor=#d6d6d6
| 437538 ||  || — || August 10, 2007 || Kitt Peak || Spacewatch || KOR || align=right | 1.3 km || 
|-id=539 bgcolor=#d6d6d6
| 437539 ||  || — || February 12, 2010 || WISE || WISE || — || align=right | 3.8 km || 
|-id=540 bgcolor=#fefefe
| 437540 ||  || — || January 27, 2007 || Kitt Peak || Spacewatch || — || align=right data-sort-value="0.93" | 930 m || 
|-id=541 bgcolor=#d6d6d6
| 437541 ||  || — || November 19, 2007 || Kitt Peak || Spacewatch || — || align=right | 3.6 km || 
|-id=542 bgcolor=#d6d6d6
| 437542 ||  || — || February 16, 2010 || WISE || WISE || EOS || align=right | 2.4 km || 
|-id=543 bgcolor=#E9E9E9
| 437543 ||  || — || September 11, 2007 || Mount Lemmon || Mount Lemmon Survey || — || align=right | 2.2 km || 
|-id=544 bgcolor=#d6d6d6
| 437544 ||  || — || October 12, 2007 || Mount Lemmon || Mount Lemmon Survey || — || align=right | 2.4 km || 
|-id=545 bgcolor=#d6d6d6
| 437545 ||  || — || July 9, 2005 || Kitt Peak || Spacewatch || — || align=right | 3.0 km || 
|-id=546 bgcolor=#E9E9E9
| 437546 ||  || — || February 25, 2006 || Catalina || CSS || — || align=right | 2.7 km || 
|-id=547 bgcolor=#d6d6d6
| 437547 ||  || — || October 31, 2013 || Mount Lemmon || Mount Lemmon Survey || — || align=right | 3.8 km || 
|-id=548 bgcolor=#d6d6d6
| 437548 ||  || — || February 19, 2009 || Catalina || CSS || — || align=right | 3.2 km || 
|-id=549 bgcolor=#E9E9E9
| 437549 ||  || — || November 20, 2009 || Kitt Peak || Spacewatch || — || align=right | 1.7 km || 
|-id=550 bgcolor=#E9E9E9
| 437550 ||  || — || September 23, 2008 || Kitt Peak || Spacewatch || MRX || align=right | 1.1 km || 
|-id=551 bgcolor=#d6d6d6
| 437551 ||  || — || October 16, 2012 || Mount Lemmon || Mount Lemmon Survey || EOS || align=right | 1.8 km || 
|-id=552 bgcolor=#E9E9E9
| 437552 ||  || — || September 30, 2000 || Socorro || LINEAR || EUN || align=right | 1.6 km || 
|-id=553 bgcolor=#E9E9E9
| 437553 ||  || — || May 8, 2011 || Kitt Peak || Spacewatch || — || align=right data-sort-value="0.84" | 840 m || 
|-id=554 bgcolor=#d6d6d6
| 437554 ||  || — || April 15, 2010 || Kitt Peak || Spacewatch || — || align=right | 3.1 km || 
|-id=555 bgcolor=#E9E9E9
| 437555 ||  || — || January 11, 2010 || Kitt Peak || Spacewatch || — || align=right | 2.0 km || 
|-id=556 bgcolor=#fefefe
| 437556 ||  || — || November 17, 2006 || Mount Lemmon || Mount Lemmon Survey || — || align=right data-sort-value="0.90" | 900 m || 
|-id=557 bgcolor=#E9E9E9
| 437557 ||  || — || June 10, 2011 || Mount Lemmon || Mount Lemmon Survey || — || align=right | 2.1 km || 
|-id=558 bgcolor=#d6d6d6
| 437558 ||  || — || November 1, 2008 || Mount Lemmon || Mount Lemmon Survey || — || align=right | 2.6 km || 
|-id=559 bgcolor=#E9E9E9
| 437559 ||  || — || October 21, 2003 || Kitt Peak || Spacewatch || AGN || align=right | 1.1 km || 
|-id=560 bgcolor=#d6d6d6
| 437560 ||  || — || October 21, 2007 || Mount Lemmon || Mount Lemmon Survey || — || align=right | 2.2 km || 
|-id=561 bgcolor=#d6d6d6
| 437561 ||  || — || December 19, 2007 || Mount Lemmon || Mount Lemmon Survey || — || align=right | 3.4 km || 
|-id=562 bgcolor=#d6d6d6
| 437562 ||  || — || November 18, 2007 || Mount Lemmon || Mount Lemmon Survey || — || align=right | 2.8 km || 
|-id=563 bgcolor=#E9E9E9
| 437563 ||  || — || September 28, 2003 || Kitt Peak || Spacewatch || AGN || align=right | 1.2 km || 
|-id=564 bgcolor=#d6d6d6
| 437564 ||  || — || February 28, 2009 || Kitt Peak || Spacewatch || THM || align=right | 1.8 km || 
|-id=565 bgcolor=#d6d6d6
| 437565 ||  || — || March 1, 2009 || Kitt Peak || Spacewatch || THM || align=right | 2.0 km || 
|-id=566 bgcolor=#d6d6d6
| 437566 ||  || — || November 2, 2007 || Kitt Peak || Spacewatch || — || align=right | 2.5 km || 
|-id=567 bgcolor=#E9E9E9
| 437567 ||  || — || April 17, 1998 || Kitt Peak || Spacewatch || — || align=right | 1.2 km || 
|-id=568 bgcolor=#E9E9E9
| 437568 ||  || — || September 23, 2008 || Mount Lemmon || Mount Lemmon Survey || — || align=right | 2.2 km || 
|-id=569 bgcolor=#E9E9E9
| 437569 ||  || — || January 6, 2010 || Kitt Peak || Spacewatch || — || align=right | 1.8 km || 
|-id=570 bgcolor=#d6d6d6
| 437570 ||  || — || September 12, 2007 || Mount Lemmon || Mount Lemmon Survey || KOR || align=right | 1.3 km || 
|-id=571 bgcolor=#E9E9E9
| 437571 ||  || — || October 21, 2003 || Kitt Peak || Spacewatch || — || align=right | 2.5 km || 
|-id=572 bgcolor=#d6d6d6
| 437572 ||  || — || February 19, 2009 || Mount Lemmon || Mount Lemmon Survey || — || align=right | 2.4 km || 
|-id=573 bgcolor=#fefefe
| 437573 ||  || — || February 9, 2007 || Catalina || CSS || — || align=right | 1.2 km || 
|-id=574 bgcolor=#fefefe
| 437574 ||  || — || December 6, 2010 || Mount Lemmon || Mount Lemmon Survey || — || align=right data-sort-value="0.57" | 570 m || 
|-id=575 bgcolor=#E9E9E9
| 437575 ||  || — || January 23, 2006 || Catalina || CSS || — || align=right | 1.3 km || 
|-id=576 bgcolor=#fefefe
| 437576 ||  || — || August 31, 2005 || Kitt Peak || Spacewatch || — || align=right | 1.0 km || 
|-id=577 bgcolor=#E9E9E9
| 437577 ||  || — || February 9, 2010 || Kitt Peak || Spacewatch || — || align=right | 1.7 km || 
|-id=578 bgcolor=#fefefe
| 437578 ||  || — || July 4, 2005 || Mount Lemmon || Mount Lemmon Survey || — || align=right data-sort-value="0.82" | 820 m || 
|-id=579 bgcolor=#d6d6d6
| 437579 ||  || — || September 20, 2011 || Mount Lemmon || Mount Lemmon Survey || EOS || align=right | 2.3 km || 
|-id=580 bgcolor=#d6d6d6
| 437580 ||  || — || March 15, 2004 || Kitt Peak || Spacewatch || EOS || align=right | 1.4 km || 
|-id=581 bgcolor=#E9E9E9
| 437581 ||  || — || August 25, 1998 || Caussols || ODAS || — || align=right | 2.2 km || 
|-id=582 bgcolor=#d6d6d6
| 437582 ||  || — || March 15, 2009 || Mount Lemmon || Mount Lemmon Survey || — || align=right | 3.2 km || 
|-id=583 bgcolor=#E9E9E9
| 437583 ||  || — || February 20, 2006 || Kitt Peak || Spacewatch || — || align=right | 1.7 km || 
|-id=584 bgcolor=#E9E9E9
| 437584 ||  || — || October 8, 2008 || Catalina || CSS || — || align=right | 1.5 km || 
|-id=585 bgcolor=#fefefe
| 437585 ||  || — || July 18, 2012 || Catalina || CSS || — || align=right data-sort-value="0.92" | 920 m || 
|-id=586 bgcolor=#d6d6d6
| 437586 ||  || — || December 22, 2008 || Kitt Peak || Spacewatch || — || align=right | 4.1 km || 
|-id=587 bgcolor=#d6d6d6
| 437587 ||  || — || February 18, 2010 || WISE || WISE || EOS || align=right | 2.0 km || 
|-id=588 bgcolor=#E9E9E9
| 437588 ||  || — || October 3, 2003 || Kitt Peak || Spacewatch || — || align=right | 2.3 km || 
|-id=589 bgcolor=#E9E9E9
| 437589 ||  || — || March 5, 2006 || Kitt Peak || Spacewatch || — || align=right | 2.2 km || 
|-id=590 bgcolor=#d6d6d6
| 437590 ||  || — || October 16, 2012 || Kitt Peak || Spacewatch || — || align=right | 3.2 km || 
|-id=591 bgcolor=#d6d6d6
| 437591 ||  || — || May 7, 2010 || Mount Lemmon || Mount Lemmon Survey || — || align=right | 2.8 km || 
|-id=592 bgcolor=#d6d6d6
| 437592 ||  || — || September 13, 2007 || Mount Lemmon || Mount Lemmon Survey || — || align=right | 2.4 km || 
|-id=593 bgcolor=#E9E9E9
| 437593 ||  || — || December 30, 2005 || Kitt Peak || Spacewatch || — || align=right | 1.1 km || 
|-id=594 bgcolor=#E9E9E9
| 437594 ||  || — || February 27, 2006 || Kitt Peak || Spacewatch || — || align=right | 1.3 km || 
|-id=595 bgcolor=#E9E9E9
| 437595 ||  || — || February 13, 2001 || Kitt Peak || Spacewatch || — || align=right | 2.3 km || 
|-id=596 bgcolor=#d6d6d6
| 437596 ||  || — || December 30, 2007 || Kitt Peak || Spacewatch || 7:4 || align=right | 3.5 km || 
|-id=597 bgcolor=#E9E9E9
| 437597 ||  || — || October 22, 2012 || Mount Lemmon || Mount Lemmon Survey || HOF || align=right | 2.3 km || 
|-id=598 bgcolor=#d6d6d6
| 437598 ||  || — || February 18, 2010 || WISE || WISE || — || align=right | 5.2 km || 
|-id=599 bgcolor=#E9E9E9
| 437599 ||  || — || December 27, 2005 || Kitt Peak || Spacewatch || — || align=right | 1.1 km || 
|-id=600 bgcolor=#E9E9E9
| 437600 ||  || — || March 12, 2010 || Mount Lemmon || Mount Lemmon Survey || AGN || align=right | 1.1 km || 
|}

437601–437700 

|-bgcolor=#E9E9E9
| 437601 ||  || — || September 26, 2012 || Mount Lemmon || Mount Lemmon Survey || — || align=right | 1.7 km || 
|-id=602 bgcolor=#d6d6d6
| 437602 ||  || — || December 30, 2007 || Catalina || CSS || — || align=right | 4.1 km || 
|-id=603 bgcolor=#E9E9E9
| 437603 ||  || — || March 18, 2010 || Kitt Peak || Spacewatch || AGN || align=right | 1.1 km || 
|-id=604 bgcolor=#E9E9E9
| 437604 ||  || — || October 26, 2012 || Mount Lemmon || Mount Lemmon Survey || — || align=right | 2.3 km || 
|-id=605 bgcolor=#d6d6d6
| 437605 ||  || — || March 3, 2009 || Mount Lemmon || Mount Lemmon Survey || — || align=right | 2.6 km || 
|-id=606 bgcolor=#d6d6d6
| 437606 ||  || — || March 25, 2010 || WISE || WISE || Tj (2.97) || align=right | 3.6 km || 
|-id=607 bgcolor=#d6d6d6
| 437607 ||  || — || January 12, 2008 || Mount Lemmon || Mount Lemmon Survey || — || align=right | 2.6 km || 
|-id=608 bgcolor=#fefefe
| 437608 ||  || — || December 27, 2005 || Mount Lemmon || Mount Lemmon Survey || — || align=right | 1.0 km || 
|-id=609 bgcolor=#E9E9E9
| 437609 ||  || — || September 15, 2004 || Kitt Peak || Spacewatch || — || align=right data-sort-value="0.96" | 960 m || 
|-id=610 bgcolor=#E9E9E9
| 437610 ||  || — || January 15, 2005 || Kitt Peak || Spacewatch || — || align=right | 1.9 km || 
|-id=611 bgcolor=#E9E9E9
| 437611 ||  || — || October 21, 2003 || Kitt Peak || Spacewatch || — || align=right | 2.2 km || 
|-id=612 bgcolor=#E9E9E9
| 437612 ||  || — || September 13, 2004 || Kitt Peak || Spacewatch || (5) || align=right data-sort-value="0.89" | 890 m || 
|-id=613 bgcolor=#E9E9E9
| 437613 ||  || — || January 7, 2002 || Kitt Peak || Spacewatch || — || align=right | 1.2 km || 
|-id=614 bgcolor=#E9E9E9
| 437614 ||  || — || November 1, 2008 || Kitt Peak || Spacewatch || — || align=right | 2.8 km || 
|-id=615 bgcolor=#d6d6d6
| 437615 ||  || — || February 1, 2009 || Kitt Peak || Spacewatch || — || align=right | 3.0 km || 
|-id=616 bgcolor=#d6d6d6
| 437616 ||  || — || December 24, 2013 || Mount Lemmon || Mount Lemmon Survey || — || align=right | 2.9 km || 
|-id=617 bgcolor=#d6d6d6
| 437617 ||  || — || March 3, 1997 || Kitt Peak || Spacewatch || — || align=right | 5.0 km || 
|-id=618 bgcolor=#E9E9E9
| 437618 ||  || — || February 17, 2010 || Catalina || CSS || — || align=right | 1.5 km || 
|-id=619 bgcolor=#fefefe
| 437619 ||  || — || March 27, 2011 || Mount Lemmon || Mount Lemmon Survey || — || align=right | 1.0 km || 
|-id=620 bgcolor=#d6d6d6
| 437620 ||  || — || August 29, 2006 || Kitt Peak || Spacewatch || — || align=right | 3.9 km || 
|-id=621 bgcolor=#d6d6d6
| 437621 ||  || — || August 29, 2006 || Kitt Peak || Spacewatch || EOS || align=right | 1.7 km || 
|-id=622 bgcolor=#E9E9E9
| 437622 ||  || — || October 9, 2004 || Kitt Peak || Spacewatch || — || align=right data-sort-value="0.96" | 960 m || 
|-id=623 bgcolor=#E9E9E9
| 437623 ||  || — || September 25, 2012 || Kitt Peak || Spacewatch || — || align=right | 2.8 km || 
|-id=624 bgcolor=#E9E9E9
| 437624 ||  || — || October 26, 2008 || Mount Lemmon || Mount Lemmon Survey || — || align=right | 2.3 km || 
|-id=625 bgcolor=#E9E9E9
| 437625 ||  || — || March 5, 2006 || Kitt Peak || Spacewatch || — || align=right | 1.2 km || 
|-id=626 bgcolor=#E9E9E9
| 437626 ||  || — || October 6, 2008 || Mount Lemmon || Mount Lemmon Survey || — || align=right | 1.9 km || 
|-id=627 bgcolor=#d6d6d6
| 437627 ||  || — || July 6, 2005 || Kitt Peak || Spacewatch || — || align=right | 3.0 km || 
|-id=628 bgcolor=#E9E9E9
| 437628 ||  || — || September 28, 2003 || Kitt Peak || Spacewatch || — || align=right | 3.5 km || 
|-id=629 bgcolor=#E9E9E9
| 437629 ||  || — || October 27, 2008 || Catalina || CSS || MAR || align=right | 1.4 km || 
|-id=630 bgcolor=#d6d6d6
| 437630 ||  || — || February 26, 2009 || Mount Lemmon || Mount Lemmon Survey || THM || align=right | 2.1 km || 
|-id=631 bgcolor=#E9E9E9
| 437631 ||  || — || October 7, 2008 || Mount Lemmon || Mount Lemmon Survey || — || align=right | 1.4 km || 
|-id=632 bgcolor=#d6d6d6
| 437632 ||  || — || December 20, 2007 || Mount Lemmon || Mount Lemmon Survey || — || align=right | 3.2 km || 
|-id=633 bgcolor=#d6d6d6
| 437633 ||  || — || June 30, 2005 || Kitt Peak || Spacewatch || VER || align=right | 3.5 km || 
|-id=634 bgcolor=#d6d6d6
| 437634 ||  || — || February 21, 2003 || Kvistaberg || UDAS || — || align=right | 3.4 km || 
|-id=635 bgcolor=#E9E9E9
| 437635 ||  || — || November 24, 2008 || Catalina || CSS || — || align=right | 3.0 km || 
|-id=636 bgcolor=#d6d6d6
| 437636 ||  || — || December 3, 2007 || Kitt Peak || Spacewatch || — || align=right | 3.8 km || 
|-id=637 bgcolor=#E9E9E9
| 437637 ||  || — || December 1, 2008 || Kitt Peak || Spacewatch || HOF || align=right | 2.7 km || 
|-id=638 bgcolor=#d6d6d6
| 437638 ||  || — || March 28, 2009 || Kitt Peak || Spacewatch || EOS || align=right | 1.9 km || 
|-id=639 bgcolor=#d6d6d6
| 437639 ||  || — || January 13, 2008 || Kitt Peak || Spacewatch || — || align=right | 2.8 km || 
|-id=640 bgcolor=#d6d6d6
| 437640 ||  || — || February 5, 2009 || Kitt Peak || Spacewatch || NAE || align=right | 2.2 km || 
|-id=641 bgcolor=#d6d6d6
| 437641 ||  || — || August 19, 2006 || Kitt Peak || Spacewatch || — || align=right | 2.5 km || 
|-id=642 bgcolor=#E9E9E9
| 437642 ||  || — || December 21, 2008 || Kitt Peak || Spacewatch || AGN || align=right | 1.4 km || 
|-id=643 bgcolor=#E9E9E9
| 437643 ||  || — || September 10, 2004 || Needville || W. G. Dillon, M. Eastman || — || align=right | 1.3 km || 
|-id=644 bgcolor=#d6d6d6
| 437644 ||  || — || January 29, 2009 || Kitt Peak || Spacewatch || — || align=right | 2.2 km || 
|-id=645 bgcolor=#E9E9E9
| 437645 ||  || — || August 23, 2007 || Kitt Peak || Spacewatch || — || align=right | 2.0 km || 
|-id=646 bgcolor=#d6d6d6
| 437646 ||  || — || September 19, 2001 || Socorro || LINEAR || — || align=right | 3.3 km || 
|-id=647 bgcolor=#E9E9E9
| 437647 ||  || — || January 28, 2006 || Mount Lemmon || Mount Lemmon Survey || — || align=right | 1.6 km || 
|-id=648 bgcolor=#d6d6d6
| 437648 ||  || — || October 8, 2007 || Kitt Peak || Spacewatch || — || align=right | 2.6 km || 
|-id=649 bgcolor=#E9E9E9
| 437649 ||  || — || November 21, 1995 || Kitt Peak || Spacewatch || — || align=right | 1.6 km || 
|-id=650 bgcolor=#d6d6d6
| 437650 ||  || — || January 28, 2003 || Kitt Peak || Spacewatch || — || align=right | 3.2 km || 
|-id=651 bgcolor=#d6d6d6
| 437651 ||  || — || March 19, 2009 || Kitt Peak || Spacewatch || VER || align=right | 2.3 km || 
|-id=652 bgcolor=#E9E9E9
| 437652 ||  || — || December 20, 2009 || Mount Lemmon || Mount Lemmon Survey || MAR || align=right | 1.6 km || 
|-id=653 bgcolor=#d6d6d6
| 437653 ||  || — || January 26, 2003 || Kitt Peak || Spacewatch || EOS || align=right | 2.6 km || 
|-id=654 bgcolor=#d6d6d6
| 437654 ||  || — || October 9, 2012 || Catalina || CSS || — || align=right | 3.8 km || 
|-id=655 bgcolor=#d6d6d6
| 437655 ||  || — || April 16, 2005 || Kitt Peak || Spacewatch || — || align=right | 2.5 km || 
|-id=656 bgcolor=#d6d6d6
| 437656 ||  || — || May 13, 2010 || Kitt Peak || Spacewatch || — || align=right | 3.4 km || 
|-id=657 bgcolor=#d6d6d6
| 437657 ||  || — || July 1, 2011 || Mount Lemmon || Mount Lemmon Survey || EOS || align=right | 2.2 km || 
|-id=658 bgcolor=#d6d6d6
| 437658 ||  || — || December 31, 2008 || Kitt Peak || Spacewatch || EOS || align=right | 2.3 km || 
|-id=659 bgcolor=#E9E9E9
| 437659 ||  || — || October 13, 1998 || Kitt Peak || Spacewatch || HOF || align=right | 2.8 km || 
|-id=660 bgcolor=#E9E9E9
| 437660 ||  || — || December 29, 2008 || Kitt Peak || Spacewatch || — || align=right | 2.5 km || 
|-id=661 bgcolor=#fefefe
| 437661 ||  || — || December 29, 2005 || Mount Lemmon || Mount Lemmon Survey || — || align=right | 1.0 km || 
|-id=662 bgcolor=#d6d6d6
| 437662 ||  || — || January 19, 2004 || Kitt Peak || Spacewatch || KOR || align=right | 1.4 km || 
|-id=663 bgcolor=#d6d6d6
| 437663 ||  || — || January 17, 2009 || Kitt Peak || Spacewatch || EOS || align=right | 1.7 km || 
|-id=664 bgcolor=#E9E9E9
| 437664 ||  || — || January 20, 2006 || Kitt Peak || Spacewatch || — || align=right | 1.1 km || 
|-id=665 bgcolor=#d6d6d6
| 437665 ||  || — || October 30, 2007 || Kitt Peak || Spacewatch || KOR || align=right | 1.3 km || 
|-id=666 bgcolor=#d6d6d6
| 437666 ||  || — || November 5, 2007 || Kitt Peak || Spacewatch || — || align=right | 2.7 km || 
|-id=667 bgcolor=#d6d6d6
| 437667 ||  || — || November 20, 2007 || Mount Lemmon || Mount Lemmon Survey || — || align=right | 3.3 km || 
|-id=668 bgcolor=#d6d6d6
| 437668 ||  || — || December 13, 2013 || Mount Lemmon || Mount Lemmon Survey || — || align=right | 3.6 km || 
|-id=669 bgcolor=#d6d6d6
| 437669 ||  || — || December 4, 2007 || Mount Lemmon || Mount Lemmon Survey || — || align=right | 3.1 km || 
|-id=670 bgcolor=#d6d6d6
| 437670 ||  || — || January 13, 2008 || Mount Lemmon || Mount Lemmon Survey || — || align=right | 3.4 km || 
|-id=671 bgcolor=#E9E9E9
| 437671 ||  || — || September 24, 1960 || Palomar || PLS || — || align=right | 1.3 km || 
|-id=672 bgcolor=#d6d6d6
| 437672 ||  || — || January 27, 2003 || Anderson Mesa || LONEOS || — || align=right | 3.9 km || 
|-id=673 bgcolor=#E9E9E9
| 437673 ||  || — || September 16, 2003 || Kitt Peak || Spacewatch || — || align=right | 1.6 km || 
|-id=674 bgcolor=#d6d6d6
| 437674 ||  || — || October 9, 2007 || Kitt Peak || Spacewatch || — || align=right | 2.7 km || 
|-id=675 bgcolor=#d6d6d6
| 437675 ||  || — || April 4, 2010 || WISE || WISE || EMA || align=right | 4.2 km || 
|-id=676 bgcolor=#E9E9E9
| 437676 ||  || — || February 2, 2006 || Kitt Peak || Spacewatch || — || align=right | 1.2 km || 
|-id=677 bgcolor=#d6d6d6
| 437677 ||  || — || April 24, 2004 || Kitt Peak || Spacewatch || — || align=right | 3.3 km || 
|-id=678 bgcolor=#d6d6d6
| 437678 ||  || — || December 13, 2013 || Mount Lemmon || Mount Lemmon Survey || EOS || align=right | 2.4 km || 
|-id=679 bgcolor=#d6d6d6
| 437679 ||  || — || March 10, 2003 || Campo Imperatore || CINEOS || — || align=right | 3.7 km || 
|-id=680 bgcolor=#d6d6d6
| 437680 ||  || — || August 21, 2006 || Kitt Peak || Spacewatch || — || align=right | 2.9 km || 
|-id=681 bgcolor=#d6d6d6
| 437681 ||  || — || December 19, 2007 || Kitt Peak || Spacewatch || — || align=right | 3.5 km || 
|-id=682 bgcolor=#d6d6d6
| 437682 ||  || — || February 1, 2009 || Kitt Peak || Spacewatch || EOS || align=right | 1.9 km || 
|-id=683 bgcolor=#E9E9E9
| 437683 ||  || — || February 4, 2005 || Kitt Peak || Spacewatch || — || align=right | 2.2 km || 
|-id=684 bgcolor=#E9E9E9
| 437684 ||  || — || January 13, 2005 || Kitt Peak || Spacewatch || — || align=right | 2.3 km || 
|-id=685 bgcolor=#d6d6d6
| 437685 ||  || — || February 27, 2009 || Catalina || CSS || — || align=right | 3.7 km || 
|-id=686 bgcolor=#d6d6d6
| 437686 ||  || — || February 20, 2009 || Kitt Peak || Spacewatch || HYG || align=right | 2.9 km || 
|-id=687 bgcolor=#d6d6d6
| 437687 ||  || — || March 21, 2009 || Catalina || CSS || EMA || align=right | 2.8 km || 
|-id=688 bgcolor=#d6d6d6
| 437688 ||  || — || February 1, 2009 || Mount Lemmon || Mount Lemmon Survey || — || align=right | 3.5 km || 
|-id=689 bgcolor=#E9E9E9
| 437689 ||  || — || February 4, 2009 || Mount Lemmon || Mount Lemmon Survey || — || align=right | 2.6 km || 
|-id=690 bgcolor=#d6d6d6
| 437690 ||  || — || June 13, 2005 || Mount Lemmon || Mount Lemmon Survey || — || align=right | 3.0 km || 
|-id=691 bgcolor=#d6d6d6
| 437691 ||  || — || January 31, 2009 || Mount Lemmon || Mount Lemmon Survey || — || align=right | 3.1 km || 
|-id=692 bgcolor=#d6d6d6
| 437692 ||  || — || December 30, 2007 || Kitt Peak || Spacewatch || — || align=right | 2.9 km || 
|-id=693 bgcolor=#d6d6d6
| 437693 ||  || — || February 22, 1998 || Kitt Peak || Spacewatch || — || align=right | 2.8 km || 
|-id=694 bgcolor=#E9E9E9
| 437694 ||  || — || March 4, 2005 || Kitt Peak || Spacewatch || — || align=right | 2.3 km || 
|-id=695 bgcolor=#d6d6d6
| 437695 ||  || — || October 4, 1996 || Kitt Peak || Spacewatch || — || align=right | 3.0 km || 
|-id=696 bgcolor=#d6d6d6
| 437696 ||  || — || May 21, 2010 || WISE || WISE || 7:4 || align=right | 6.4 km || 
|-id=697 bgcolor=#E9E9E9
| 437697 ||  || — || August 31, 1995 || La Silla || UESAC || — || align=right | 1.4 km || 
|-id=698 bgcolor=#d6d6d6
| 437698 ||  || — || April 9, 2010 || WISE || WISE || — || align=right | 4.0 km || 
|-id=699 bgcolor=#d6d6d6
| 437699 ||  || — || September 13, 2005 || Kitt Peak || Spacewatch || EOS || align=right | 2.1 km || 
|-id=700 bgcolor=#E9E9E9
| 437700 ||  || — || September 3, 2007 || Catalina || CSS || — || align=right | 1.9 km || 
|}

437701–437800 

|-bgcolor=#d6d6d6
| 437701 ||  || — || March 2, 2009 || Mount Lemmon || Mount Lemmon Survey || THM || align=right | 2.3 km || 
|-id=702 bgcolor=#E9E9E9
| 437702 ||  || — || March 4, 2005 || Mount Lemmon || Mount Lemmon Survey || — || align=right | 2.6 km || 
|-id=703 bgcolor=#d6d6d6
| 437703 ||  || — || February 9, 2008 || Mount Lemmon || Mount Lemmon Survey || EOS || align=right | 1.9 km || 
|-id=704 bgcolor=#d6d6d6
| 437704 ||  || — || March 27, 2008 || Mount Lemmon || Mount Lemmon Survey || — || align=right | 3.9 km || 
|-id=705 bgcolor=#d6d6d6
| 437705 ||  || — || October 1, 2005 || Kitt Peak || Spacewatch || VER || align=right | 2.3 km || 
|-id=706 bgcolor=#d6d6d6
| 437706 ||  || — || November 7, 2007 || Kitt Peak || Spacewatch || — || align=right | 2.6 km || 
|-id=707 bgcolor=#E9E9E9
| 437707 ||  || — || October 20, 2003 || Kitt Peak || Spacewatch || — || align=right | 1.7 km || 
|-id=708 bgcolor=#E9E9E9
| 437708 ||  || — || March 16, 2005 || Kitt Peak || Spacewatch || AGN || align=right | 1.1 km || 
|-id=709 bgcolor=#d6d6d6
| 437709 ||  || — || January 15, 2008 || Mount Lemmon || Mount Lemmon Survey || — || align=right | 2.8 km || 
|-id=710 bgcolor=#E9E9E9
| 437710 ||  || — || October 24, 2003 || Kitt Peak || Spacewatch || — || align=right | 2.0 km || 
|-id=711 bgcolor=#E9E9E9
| 437711 ||  || — || January 26, 2006 || Kitt Peak || Spacewatch || MAR || align=right data-sort-value="0.97" | 970 m || 
|-id=712 bgcolor=#E9E9E9
| 437712 ||  || — || September 30, 2003 || Kitt Peak || Spacewatch || — || align=right | 1.3 km || 
|-id=713 bgcolor=#E9E9E9
| 437713 ||  || — || August 25, 1998 || Caussols || ODAS || MRX || align=right | 1.0 km || 
|-id=714 bgcolor=#d6d6d6
| 437714 ||  || — || November 9, 2007 || Kitt Peak || Spacewatch || — || align=right | 2.5 km || 
|-id=715 bgcolor=#d6d6d6
| 437715 ||  || — || April 21, 2004 || Kitt Peak || Spacewatch || THM || align=right | 2.5 km || 
|-id=716 bgcolor=#E9E9E9
| 437716 ||  || — || September 10, 2007 || Kitt Peak || Spacewatch || HOF || align=right | 2.7 km || 
|-id=717 bgcolor=#d6d6d6
| 437717 ||  || — || June 13, 2005 || Kitt Peak || Spacewatch || — || align=right | 2.4 km || 
|-id=718 bgcolor=#d6d6d6
| 437718 ||  || — || September 9, 2011 || Kitt Peak || Spacewatch || KOR || align=right | 1.6 km || 
|-id=719 bgcolor=#d6d6d6
| 437719 ||  || — || August 18, 2006 || Kitt Peak || Spacewatch || — || align=right | 2.7 km || 
|-id=720 bgcolor=#C2FFFF
| 437720 ||  || — || November 12, 2010 || Kitt Peak || Spacewatch || L4 || align=right | 7.8 km || 
|-id=721 bgcolor=#d6d6d6
| 437721 ||  || — || March 19, 2009 || Kitt Peak || Spacewatch || HYG || align=right | 2.8 km || 
|-id=722 bgcolor=#d6d6d6
| 437722 ||  || — || February 18, 2004 || Kitt Peak || Spacewatch || — || align=right | 2.4 km || 
|-id=723 bgcolor=#d6d6d6
| 437723 ||  || — || March 19, 2009 || Kitt Peak || Spacewatch || — || align=right | 2.7 km || 
|-id=724 bgcolor=#d6d6d6
| 437724 ||  || — || March 16, 2009 || Kitt Peak || Spacewatch || EOS || align=right | 2.1 km || 
|-id=725 bgcolor=#d6d6d6
| 437725 ||  || — || October 30, 2007 || Kitt Peak || Spacewatch || — || align=right | 2.5 km || 
|-id=726 bgcolor=#d6d6d6
| 437726 ||  || — || December 28, 2002 || Kitt Peak || Spacewatch || EMA || align=right | 3.5 km || 
|-id=727 bgcolor=#d6d6d6
| 437727 ||  || — || November 18, 2007 || Mount Lemmon || Mount Lemmon Survey || TRE || align=right | 2.9 km || 
|-id=728 bgcolor=#C2FFFF
| 437728 ||  || — || December 4, 2010 || Mount Lemmon || Mount Lemmon Survey || L4 || align=right | 7.2 km || 
|-id=729 bgcolor=#C2FFFF
| 437729 ||  || — || November 27, 2011 || Mount Lemmon || Mount Lemmon Survey || L4 || align=right | 7.8 km || 
|-id=730 bgcolor=#C2FFFF
| 437730 ||  || — || October 17, 2009 || Mount Lemmon || Mount Lemmon Survey || L4 || align=right | 7.2 km || 
|-id=731 bgcolor=#d6d6d6
| 437731 ||  || — || May 9, 2005 || Mount Lemmon || Mount Lemmon Survey || KOR || align=right | 1.4 km || 
|-id=732 bgcolor=#E9E9E9
| 437732 ||  || — || November 19, 2008 || Catalina || CSS || EUN || align=right | 1.3 km || 
|-id=733 bgcolor=#E9E9E9
| 437733 ||  || — || October 15, 2012 || Catalina || CSS || — || align=right | 2.9 km || 
|-id=734 bgcolor=#C2FFFF
| 437734 ||  || — || September 28, 2009 || Kitt Peak || Spacewatch || L4 || align=right | 8.9 km || 
|-id=735 bgcolor=#d6d6d6
| 437735 ||  || — || December 17, 2007 || Mount Lemmon || Mount Lemmon Survey || — || align=right | 3.2 km || 
|-id=736 bgcolor=#d6d6d6
| 437736 ||  || — || November 25, 2006 || Mount Lemmon || Mount Lemmon Survey || VER || align=right | 3.4 km || 
|-id=737 bgcolor=#d6d6d6
| 437737 ||  || — || February 21, 2009 || Kitt Peak || Spacewatch || — || align=right | 2.4 km || 
|-id=738 bgcolor=#d6d6d6
| 437738 ||  || — || March 12, 2008 || Kitt Peak || Spacewatch || 7:4 || align=right | 3.5 km || 
|-id=739 bgcolor=#d6d6d6
| 437739 ||  || — || December 12, 2012 || Mount Lemmon || Mount Lemmon Survey || VER || align=right | 2.6 km || 
|-id=740 bgcolor=#C2FFFF
| 437740 ||  || — || October 11, 2009 || Mount Lemmon || Mount Lemmon Survey || L4 || align=right | 7.5 km || 
|-id=741 bgcolor=#d6d6d6
| 437741 ||  || — || October 9, 2004 || Kitt Peak || Spacewatch || 7:4 || align=right | 4.0 km || 
|-id=742 bgcolor=#d6d6d6
| 437742 ||  || — || December 16, 2007 || Kitt Peak || Spacewatch || — || align=right | 2.5 km || 
|-id=743 bgcolor=#d6d6d6
| 437743 ||  || — || February 3, 2008 || Kitt Peak || Spacewatch || — || align=right | 3.3 km || 
|-id=744 bgcolor=#d6d6d6
| 437744 ||  || — || November 19, 2006 || Catalina || CSS || EOS || align=right | 2.3 km || 
|-id=745 bgcolor=#d6d6d6
| 437745 ||  || — || June 18, 2010 || WISE || WISE || — || align=right | 3.6 km || 
|-id=746 bgcolor=#E9E9E9
| 437746 ||  || — || September 25, 2012 || Mount Lemmon || Mount Lemmon Survey || — || align=right | 1.3 km || 
|-id=747 bgcolor=#d6d6d6
| 437747 ||  || — || January 10, 2003 || Kitt Peak || Spacewatch || — || align=right | 2.4 km || 
|-id=748 bgcolor=#d6d6d6
| 437748 ||  || — || October 22, 2006 || Catalina || CSS || — || align=right | 3.2 km || 
|-id=749 bgcolor=#d6d6d6
| 437749 ||  || — || January 11, 2008 || Mount Lemmon || Mount Lemmon Survey || — || align=right | 3.2 km || 
|-id=750 bgcolor=#d6d6d6
| 437750 ||  || — || March 23, 2003 || Kitt Peak || Spacewatch || Tj (2.98) || align=right | 4.0 km || 
|-id=751 bgcolor=#d6d6d6
| 437751 ||  || — || December 30, 2007 || Mount Lemmon || Mount Lemmon Survey || — || align=right | 2.9 km || 
|-id=752 bgcolor=#C2FFFF
| 437752 ||  || — || November 10, 2010 || Mount Lemmon || Mount Lemmon Survey || L4 || align=right | 7.1 km || 
|-id=753 bgcolor=#E9E9E9
| 437753 ||  || — || May 24, 2006 || Mount Lemmon || Mount Lemmon Survey || JUN || align=right | 1.6 km || 
|-id=754 bgcolor=#C2FFFF
| 437754 ||  || — || November 10, 2010 || Kitt Peak || Spacewatch || L4 || align=right | 9.3 km || 
|-id=755 bgcolor=#E9E9E9
| 437755 ||  || — || December 1, 2008 || Mount Lemmon || Mount Lemmon Survey || — || align=right | 2.9 km || 
|-id=756 bgcolor=#d6d6d6
| 437756 ||  || — || December 15, 2007 || Catalina || CSS || — || align=right | 3.4 km || 
|-id=757 bgcolor=#C2FFFF
| 437757 ||  || — || November 6, 2010 || Mount Lemmon || Mount Lemmon Survey || L4 || align=right | 6.8 km || 
|-id=758 bgcolor=#d6d6d6
| 437758 ||  || — || March 19, 2009 || Kitt Peak || Spacewatch || — || align=right | 2.6 km || 
|-id=759 bgcolor=#C2FFFF
| 437759 ||  || — || January 20, 2012 || Mount Lemmon || Mount Lemmon Survey || L4 || align=right | 8.6 km || 
|-id=760 bgcolor=#C2FFFF
| 437760 ||  || — || September 6, 2008 || Kitt Peak || Spacewatch || L4 || align=right | 7.2 km || 
|-id=761 bgcolor=#C2FFFF
| 437761 ||  || — || January 2, 2012 || Mount Lemmon || Mount Lemmon Survey || L4 || align=right | 7.3 km || 
|-id=762 bgcolor=#fefefe
| 437762 ||  || — || January 4, 2001 || Prescott || P. G. Comba || — || align=right | 1.4 km || 
|-id=763 bgcolor=#E9E9E9
| 437763 ||  || — || January 16, 2005 || Kitt Peak || Spacewatch || EUN || align=right | 2.0 km || 
|-id=764 bgcolor=#E9E9E9
| 437764 ||  || — || September 22, 1998 || Anderson Mesa || LONEOS || — || align=right | 4.7 km || 
|-id=765 bgcolor=#d6d6d6
| 437765 ||  || — || October 7, 2007 || Kitt Peak || Spacewatch || — || align=right | 5.0 km || 
|-id=766 bgcolor=#FA8072
| 437766 ||  || — || April 7, 2005 || Catalina || CSS || H || align=right data-sort-value="0.74" | 740 m || 
|-id=767 bgcolor=#fefefe
| 437767 ||  || — || November 16, 2006 || Kitt Peak || Spacewatch || — || align=right data-sort-value="0.72" | 720 m || 
|-id=768 bgcolor=#E9E9E9
| 437768 ||  || — || January 4, 2006 || Kitt Peak || Spacewatch || — || align=right | 2.1 km || 
|-id=769 bgcolor=#E9E9E9
| 437769 ||  || — || February 26, 2007 || Mount Lemmon || Mount Lemmon Survey || — || align=right | 1.5 km || 
|-id=770 bgcolor=#d6d6d6
| 437770 ||  || — || December 11, 2004 || Kitt Peak || Spacewatch || KOR || align=right | 1.4 km || 
|-id=771 bgcolor=#E9E9E9
| 437771 ||  || — || September 28, 2009 || Mount Lemmon || Mount Lemmon Survey || — || align=right | 1.7 km || 
|-id=772 bgcolor=#d6d6d6
| 437772 ||  || — || September 27, 2006 || Kitt Peak || Spacewatch || — || align=right | 3.5 km || 
|-id=773 bgcolor=#d6d6d6
| 437773 ||  || — || May 9, 2005 || Kitt Peak || Spacewatch || — || align=right | 3.2 km || 
|-id=774 bgcolor=#d6d6d6
| 437774 ||  || — || April 2, 2005 || Mount Lemmon || Mount Lemmon Survey || — || align=right | 2.8 km || 
|-id=775 bgcolor=#E9E9E9
| 437775 ||  || — || December 18, 2004 || Mount Lemmon || Mount Lemmon Survey || AGN || align=right | 1.3 km || 
|-id=776 bgcolor=#d6d6d6
| 437776 ||  || — || September 11, 2007 || Mount Lemmon || Mount Lemmon Survey || — || align=right | 3.5 km || 
|-id=777 bgcolor=#E9E9E9
| 437777 ||  || — || March 10, 1997 || Kitt Peak || Spacewatch || — || align=right | 2.0 km || 
|-id=778 bgcolor=#E9E9E9
| 437778 ||  || — || March 28, 1998 || Socorro || LINEAR || — || align=right | 1.9 km || 
|-id=779 bgcolor=#E9E9E9
| 437779 ||  || — || June 8, 1999 || Kitt Peak || Spacewatch || — || align=right | 2.5 km || 
|-id=780 bgcolor=#fefefe
| 437780 ||  || — || November 16, 2006 || Catalina || CSS || — || align=right | 1.2 km || 
|-id=781 bgcolor=#d6d6d6
| 437781 ||  || — || May 25, 2010 || WISE || WISE || EOS || align=right | 5.6 km || 
|-id=782 bgcolor=#E9E9E9
| 437782 ||  || — || January 6, 2006 || Kitt Peak || Spacewatch || — || align=right | 2.0 km || 
|-id=783 bgcolor=#d6d6d6
| 437783 ||  || — || November 19, 2008 || Mount Lemmon || Mount Lemmon Survey || — || align=right | 2.8 km || 
|-id=784 bgcolor=#fefefe
| 437784 ||  || — || January 14, 2002 || Kitt Peak || Spacewatch || — || align=right data-sort-value="0.65" | 650 m || 
|-id=785 bgcolor=#E9E9E9
| 437785 ||  || — || October 7, 2008 || Mount Lemmon || Mount Lemmon Survey || AGN || align=right | 1.4 km || 
|-id=786 bgcolor=#fefefe
| 437786 ||  || — || December 26, 2006 || Kitt Peak || Spacewatch || NYS || align=right data-sort-value="0.80" | 800 m || 
|-id=787 bgcolor=#fefefe
| 437787 ||  || — || April 12, 2005 || Mount Lemmon || Mount Lemmon Survey || — || align=right data-sort-value="0.91" | 910 m || 
|-id=788 bgcolor=#E9E9E9
| 437788 ||  || — || October 8, 2004 || Anderson Mesa || LONEOS || — || align=right | 2.0 km || 
|-id=789 bgcolor=#d6d6d6
| 437789 ||  || — || February 26, 2009 || Catalina || CSS || — || align=right | 4.1 km || 
|-id=790 bgcolor=#d6d6d6
| 437790 ||  || — || January 30, 2004 || Kitt Peak || Spacewatch || fast? || align=right | 3.6 km || 
|-id=791 bgcolor=#E9E9E9
| 437791 ||  || — || September 6, 2004 || Siding Spring || SSS || — || align=right | 2.1 km || 
|-id=792 bgcolor=#fefefe
| 437792 ||  || — || January 28, 2004 || Kitt Peak || Spacewatch || — || align=right data-sort-value="0.83" | 830 m || 
|-id=793 bgcolor=#d6d6d6
| 437793 ||  || — || November 7, 2008 || Mount Lemmon || Mount Lemmon Survey || — || align=right | 2.4 km || 
|-id=794 bgcolor=#E9E9E9
| 437794 ||  || — || July 30, 2008 || Kitt Peak || Spacewatch || — || align=right | 1.2 km || 
|-id=795 bgcolor=#d6d6d6
| 437795 ||  || — || March 18, 2004 || Socorro || LINEAR || — || align=right | 3.8 km || 
|-id=796 bgcolor=#fefefe
| 437796 ||  || — || July 29, 2008 || Mount Lemmon || Mount Lemmon Survey || — || align=right | 1.1 km || 
|-id=797 bgcolor=#E9E9E9
| 437797 ||  || — || November 26, 2009 || Mount Lemmon || Mount Lemmon Survey || — || align=right data-sort-value="0.90" | 900 m || 
|-id=798 bgcolor=#fefefe
| 437798 ||  || — || February 7, 2002 || Kitt Peak || Spacewatch || — || align=right data-sort-value="0.86" | 860 m || 
|-id=799 bgcolor=#E9E9E9
| 437799 ||  || — || September 28, 2008 || Mount Lemmon || Mount Lemmon Survey || — || align=right | 3.3 km || 
|-id=800 bgcolor=#d6d6d6
| 437800 ||  || — || February 4, 2010 || WISE || WISE || — || align=right | 2.3 km || 
|}

437801–437900 

|-bgcolor=#d6d6d6
| 437801 ||  || — || February 11, 2004 || Kitt Peak || Spacewatch || — || align=right | 2.9 km || 
|-id=802 bgcolor=#E9E9E9
| 437802 ||  || — || December 14, 2001 || Kitt Peak || Spacewatch || — || align=right | 1.0 km || 
|-id=803 bgcolor=#E9E9E9
| 437803 ||  || — || October 8, 2008 || Kitt Peak || Spacewatch || — || align=right | 2.4 km || 
|-id=804 bgcolor=#d6d6d6
| 437804 ||  || — || February 12, 2004 || Kitt Peak || Spacewatch || THM || align=right | 2.3 km || 
|-id=805 bgcolor=#E9E9E9
| 437805 ||  || — || March 2, 2006 || Kitt Peak || Spacewatch || AST || align=right | 1.6 km || 
|-id=806 bgcolor=#E9E9E9
| 437806 ||  || — || October 4, 2000 || Kitt Peak || Spacewatch || — || align=right | 1.3 km || 
|-id=807 bgcolor=#d6d6d6
| 437807 ||  || — || May 2, 2006 || Mount Lemmon || Mount Lemmon Survey || KOR || align=right | 1.6 km || 
|-id=808 bgcolor=#fefefe
| 437808 ||  || — || March 3, 2000 || Socorro || LINEAR || — || align=right data-sort-value="0.86" | 860 m || 
|-id=809 bgcolor=#fefefe
| 437809 ||  || — || April 1, 2008 || Mount Lemmon || Mount Lemmon Survey || — || align=right data-sort-value="0.89" | 890 m || 
|-id=810 bgcolor=#E9E9E9
| 437810 ||  || — || March 2, 2006 || Mount Lemmon || Mount Lemmon Survey || — || align=right | 2.6 km || 
|-id=811 bgcolor=#d6d6d6
| 437811 ||  || — || October 27, 2003 || Kitt Peak || Spacewatch || — || align=right | 2.1 km || 
|-id=812 bgcolor=#E9E9E9
| 437812 ||  || — || March 21, 2002 || Kitt Peak || Spacewatch || EUN || align=right | 1.3 km || 
|-id=813 bgcolor=#E9E9E9
| 437813 ||  || — || September 23, 2008 || Kitt Peak || Spacewatch || — || align=right | 1.7 km || 
|-id=814 bgcolor=#fefefe
| 437814 ||  || — || April 13, 2004 || Kitt Peak || Spacewatch || MAS || align=right data-sort-value="0.85" | 850 m || 
|-id=815 bgcolor=#d6d6d6
| 437815 ||  || — || April 30, 2006 || Kitt Peak || Spacewatch || KOR || align=right | 1.6 km || 
|-id=816 bgcolor=#d6d6d6
| 437816 ||  || — || February 14, 2010 || Mount Lemmon || Mount Lemmon Survey || — || align=right | 3.2 km || 
|-id=817 bgcolor=#d6d6d6
| 437817 ||  || — || April 28, 2000 || Kitt Peak || Spacewatch || — || align=right | 3.0 km || 
|-id=818 bgcolor=#fefefe
| 437818 ||  || — || January 15, 2001 || Socorro || LINEAR || — || align=right | 1.3 km || 
|-id=819 bgcolor=#d6d6d6
| 437819 ||  || — || September 18, 2012 || Mount Lemmon || Mount Lemmon Survey || — || align=right | 3.2 km || 
|-id=820 bgcolor=#E9E9E9
| 437820 ||  || — || December 30, 2005 || Kitt Peak || Spacewatch || — || align=right | 1.7 km || 
|-id=821 bgcolor=#fefefe
| 437821 ||  || — || March 31, 2008 || Mount Lemmon || Mount Lemmon Survey || — || align=right data-sort-value="0.82" | 820 m || 
|-id=822 bgcolor=#E9E9E9
| 437822 ||  || — || October 6, 2008 || Kitt Peak || Spacewatch ||  || align=right | 1.7 km || 
|-id=823 bgcolor=#E9E9E9
| 437823 ||  || — || May 12, 2007 || Kitt Peak || Spacewatch || (5) || align=right data-sort-value="0.79" | 790 m || 
|-id=824 bgcolor=#d6d6d6
| 437824 ||  || — || October 9, 2007 || Kitt Peak || Spacewatch || — || align=right | 3.5 km || 
|-id=825 bgcolor=#d6d6d6
| 437825 ||  || — || September 15, 2007 || Kitt Peak || Spacewatch || TIR || align=right | 2.9 km || 
|-id=826 bgcolor=#fefefe
| 437826 ||  || — || April 21, 2004 || Kitt Peak || Spacewatch || — || align=right data-sort-value="0.81" | 810 m || 
|-id=827 bgcolor=#d6d6d6
| 437827 ||  || — || September 4, 2007 || Mount Lemmon || Mount Lemmon Survey || — || align=right | 4.3 km || 
|-id=828 bgcolor=#E9E9E9
| 437828 ||  || — || February 24, 2006 || Catalina || CSS || — || align=right | 2.4 km || 
|-id=829 bgcolor=#d6d6d6
| 437829 ||  || — || June 11, 2004 || Socorro || LINEAR || — || align=right | 5.8 km || 
|-id=830 bgcolor=#E9E9E9
| 437830 ||  || — || October 16, 1977 || Palomar || PLS || — || align=right | 1.2 km || 
|-id=831 bgcolor=#fefefe
| 437831 ||  || — || October 16, 1977 || Palomar || PLS || — || align=right data-sort-value="0.75" | 750 m || 
|-id=832 bgcolor=#E9E9E9
| 437832 ||  || — || October 16, 1977 || Palomar || PLS || — || align=right | 1.8 km || 
|-id=833 bgcolor=#d6d6d6
| 437833 ||  || — || August 10, 1994 || La Silla || E. W. Elst || — || align=right | 2.4 km || 
|-id=834 bgcolor=#E9E9E9
| 437834 ||  || — || September 21, 1995 || Kitt Peak || Spacewatch || — || align=right data-sort-value="0.83" | 830 m || 
|-id=835 bgcolor=#E9E9E9
| 437835 ||  || — || October 25, 1995 || Kitt Peak || Spacewatch || MAR || align=right data-sort-value="0.79" | 790 m || 
|-id=836 bgcolor=#d6d6d6
| 437836 ||  || — || January 24, 1996 || Kitt Peak || Spacewatch || — || align=right | 2.5 km || 
|-id=837 bgcolor=#fefefe
| 437837 ||  || — || May 15, 1996 || Kitt Peak || Spacewatch || — || align=right data-sort-value="0.83" | 830 m || 
|-id=838 bgcolor=#E9E9E9
| 437838 ||  || — || June 8, 1996 || Kitt Peak || Spacewatch || — || align=right | 1.7 km || 
|-id=839 bgcolor=#fefefe
| 437839 ||  || — || November 8, 1996 || Kitt Peak || Spacewatch || — || align=right data-sort-value="0.76" | 760 m || 
|-id=840 bgcolor=#fefefe
| 437840 ||  || — || September 30, 1997 || Kitt Peak || Spacewatch || MAS || align=right data-sort-value="0.56" | 560 m || 
|-id=841 bgcolor=#FFC2E0
| 437841 ||  || — || April 25, 1998 || Haleakala || NEAT || ATEPHA || align=right data-sort-value="0.22" | 220 m || 
|-id=842 bgcolor=#E9E9E9
| 437842 ||  || — || September 14, 1998 || Socorro || LINEAR || — || align=right | 2.4 km || 
|-id=843 bgcolor=#fefefe
| 437843 ||  || — || September 20, 1998 || Kitt Peak || Spacewatch || — || align=right data-sort-value="0.62" | 620 m || 
|-id=844 bgcolor=#FFC2E0
| 437844 ||  || — || June 22, 1999 || Catalina || CSS || ATEPHA || align=right data-sort-value="0.21" | 210 m || 
|-id=845 bgcolor=#E9E9E9
| 437845 ||  || — || September 7, 1999 || Socorro || LINEAR || — || align=right | 2.0 km || 
|-id=846 bgcolor=#FFC2E0
| 437846 ||  || — || September 6, 1999 || Kitt Peak || Spacewatch || APO || align=right data-sort-value="0.46" | 460 m || 
|-id=847 bgcolor=#d6d6d6
| 437847 ||  || — || September 9, 1999 || Socorro || LINEAR || — || align=right | 3.0 km || 
|-id=848 bgcolor=#E9E9E9
| 437848 ||  || — || October 9, 1999 || Kitt Peak || Spacewatch || — || align=right data-sort-value="0.86" | 860 m || 
|-id=849 bgcolor=#E9E9E9
| 437849 ||  || — || October 7, 1999 || Socorro || LINEAR || — || align=right | 1.2 km || 
|-id=850 bgcolor=#E9E9E9
| 437850 ||  || — || October 15, 1999 || Socorro || LINEAR || — || align=right | 1.2 km || 
|-id=851 bgcolor=#E9E9E9
| 437851 ||  || — || October 6, 1999 || Socorro || LINEAR || — || align=right | 2.1 km || 
|-id=852 bgcolor=#E9E9E9
| 437852 ||  || — || October 2, 1999 || Catalina || CSS || — || align=right data-sort-value="0.85" | 850 m || 
|-id=853 bgcolor=#E9E9E9
| 437853 ||  || — || November 9, 1999 || Socorro || LINEAR || — || align=right | 1.8 km || 
|-id=854 bgcolor=#E9E9E9
| 437854 ||  || — || December 7, 1999 || Socorro || LINEAR || — || align=right | 2.3 km || 
|-id=855 bgcolor=#d6d6d6
| 437855 ||  || — || December 31, 1999 || Kitt Peak || Spacewatch || — || align=right | 2.7 km || 
|-id=856 bgcolor=#E9E9E9
| 437856 ||  || — || January 6, 2000 || Kitt Peak || Spacewatch || — || align=right | 1.6 km || 
|-id=857 bgcolor=#fefefe
| 437857 ||  || — || March 12, 2000 || Socorro || LINEAR || — || align=right | 1.1 km || 
|-id=858 bgcolor=#fefefe
| 437858 ||  || — || May 25, 2000 || Kitt Peak || Spacewatch || — || align=right data-sort-value="0.95" | 950 m || 
|-id=859 bgcolor=#fefefe
| 437859 ||  || — || August 31, 2000 || Socorro || LINEAR || — || align=right data-sort-value="0.93" | 930 m || 
|-id=860 bgcolor=#fefefe
| 437860 ||  || — || September 19, 2000 || Kitt Peak || Spacewatch || — || align=right data-sort-value="0.99" | 990 m || 
|-id=861 bgcolor=#fefefe
| 437861 ||  || — || July 7, 2000 || Socorro || LINEAR || — || align=right | 1.3 km || 
|-id=862 bgcolor=#d6d6d6
| 437862 ||  || — || September 22, 2000 || Socorro || LINEAR || — || align=right | 3.1 km || 
|-id=863 bgcolor=#d6d6d6
| 437863 ||  || — || September 22, 2000 || Socorro || LINEAR || — || align=right | 3.8 km || 
|-id=864 bgcolor=#fefefe
| 437864 ||  || — || September 23, 2000 || Anderson Mesa || LONEOS || — || align=right | 1.0 km || 
|-id=865 bgcolor=#E9E9E9
| 437865 ||  || — || October 25, 2000 || Socorro || LINEAR || — || align=right | 1.2 km || 
|-id=866 bgcolor=#d6d6d6
| 437866 ||  || — || November 21, 2000 || Socorro || LINEAR || — || align=right | 4.5 km || 
|-id=867 bgcolor=#E9E9E9
| 437867 ||  || — || December 22, 2000 || Anderson Mesa || LONEOS || — || align=right | 1.7 km || 
|-id=868 bgcolor=#E9E9E9
| 437868 ||  || — || December 28, 2000 || Kitt Peak || Spacewatch || — || align=right | 1.3 km || 
|-id=869 bgcolor=#E9E9E9
| 437869 ||  || — || December 27, 2000 || Kitt Peak || Spacewatch || — || align=right | 1.2 km || 
|-id=870 bgcolor=#E9E9E9
| 437870 ||  || — || February 17, 2001 || Socorro || LINEAR || — || align=right | 1.7 km || 
|-id=871 bgcolor=#C2E0FF
| 437871 ||  || — || March 26, 2001 || Kitt Peak || M. W. Buie || other TNOcritical || align=right | 161 km || 
|-id=872 bgcolor=#E9E9E9
| 437872 ||  || — || July 16, 2001 || Haleakala || NEAT || — || align=right | 2.1 km || 
|-id=873 bgcolor=#fefefe
| 437873 ||  || — || July 28, 2001 || Anderson Mesa || LONEOS || — || align=right data-sort-value="0.91" | 910 m || 
|-id=874 bgcolor=#fefefe
| 437874 ||  || — || August 16, 2001 || Socorro || LINEAR || NYS || align=right data-sort-value="0.73" | 730 m || 
|-id=875 bgcolor=#E9E9E9
| 437875 ||  || — || August 20, 2001 || Socorro || LINEAR || — || align=right | 3.3 km || 
|-id=876 bgcolor=#fefefe
| 437876 ||  || — || July 20, 2001 || Anderson Mesa || LONEOS || — || align=right data-sort-value="0.98" | 980 m || 
|-id=877 bgcolor=#fefefe
| 437877 ||  || — || August 24, 2001 || Anderson Mesa || LONEOS || — || align=right data-sort-value="0.93" | 930 m || 
|-id=878 bgcolor=#fefefe
| 437878 ||  || — || August 19, 2001 || Socorro || LINEAR || — || align=right data-sort-value="0.83" | 830 m || 
|-id=879 bgcolor=#FFC2E0
| 437879 ||  || — || September 8, 2001 || Anderson Mesa || LONEOS || AMO +1km || align=right | 1.8 km || 
|-id=880 bgcolor=#fefefe
| 437880 ||  || — || August 24, 2001 || Socorro || LINEAR || — || align=right data-sort-value="0.84" | 840 m || 
|-id=881 bgcolor=#fefefe
| 437881 ||  || — || September 12, 2001 || Socorro || LINEAR || — || align=right | 1.6 km || 
|-id=882 bgcolor=#fefefe
| 437882 ||  || — || September 12, 2001 || Socorro || LINEAR || NYS || align=right data-sort-value="0.63" | 630 m || 
|-id=883 bgcolor=#E9E9E9
| 437883 ||  || — || September 11, 2001 || Anderson Mesa || LONEOS || — || align=right | 2.6 km || 
|-id=884 bgcolor=#E9E9E9
| 437884 ||  || — || September 12, 2001 || Socorro || LINEAR || — || align=right | 2.1 km || 
|-id=885 bgcolor=#fefefe
| 437885 ||  || — || September 12, 2001 || Socorro || LINEAR || — || align=right data-sort-value="0.73" | 730 m || 
|-id=886 bgcolor=#E9E9E9
| 437886 ||  || — || September 16, 2001 || Socorro || LINEAR || — || align=right | 2.7 km || 
|-id=887 bgcolor=#d6d6d6
| 437887 ||  || — || August 22, 2001 || Kitt Peak || Spacewatch || — || align=right | 2.4 km || 
|-id=888 bgcolor=#E9E9E9
| 437888 ||  || — || September 16, 2001 || Socorro || LINEAR || GEF || align=right | 1.4 km || 
|-id=889 bgcolor=#d6d6d6
| 437889 ||  || — || September 19, 2001 || Socorro || LINEAR || — || align=right | 2.3 km || 
|-id=890 bgcolor=#fefefe
| 437890 ||  || — || September 18, 2001 || Kitt Peak || Spacewatch || MAS || align=right data-sort-value="0.80" | 800 m || 
|-id=891 bgcolor=#fefefe
| 437891 ||  || — || September 19, 2001 || Socorro || LINEAR || MAS || align=right data-sort-value="0.66" | 660 m || 
|-id=892 bgcolor=#fefefe
| 437892 ||  || — || September 19, 2001 || Socorro || LINEAR || — || align=right data-sort-value="0.87" | 870 m || 
|-id=893 bgcolor=#fefefe
| 437893 ||  || — || September 19, 2001 || Socorro || LINEAR || — || align=right data-sort-value="0.75" | 750 m || 
|-id=894 bgcolor=#fefefe
| 437894 ||  || — || September 20, 2001 || Socorro || LINEAR || — || align=right data-sort-value="0.75" | 750 m || 
|-id=895 bgcolor=#fefefe
| 437895 ||  || — || October 7, 2001 || Palomar || NEAT || — || align=right data-sort-value="0.82" | 820 m || 
|-id=896 bgcolor=#fefefe
| 437896 ||  || — || October 14, 2001 || Socorro || LINEAR || NYS || align=right data-sort-value="0.58" | 580 m || 
|-id=897 bgcolor=#fefefe
| 437897 ||  || — || October 16, 2001 || Socorro || LINEAR || ERI || align=right | 1.3 km || 
|-id=898 bgcolor=#fefefe
| 437898 ||  || — || October 17, 2001 || Socorro || LINEAR || — || align=right data-sort-value="0.68" | 680 m || 
|-id=899 bgcolor=#fefefe
| 437899 ||  || — || October 17, 2001 || Socorro || LINEAR || — || align=right data-sort-value="0.99" | 990 m || 
|-id=900 bgcolor=#fefefe
| 437900 ||  || — || October 20, 2001 || Socorro || LINEAR || NYS || align=right data-sort-value="0.69" | 690 m || 
|}

437901–438000 

|-bgcolor=#fefefe
| 437901 ||  || — || September 21, 2001 || Anderson Mesa || LONEOS || — || align=right | 1.4 km || 
|-id=902 bgcolor=#fefefe
| 437902 ||  || — || September 26, 2001 || Socorro || LINEAR || NYS || align=right data-sort-value="0.77" | 770 m || 
|-id=903 bgcolor=#d6d6d6
| 437903 ||  || — || November 11, 2001 || Apache Point || SDSS || — || align=right | 2.3 km || 
|-id=904 bgcolor=#fefefe
| 437904 ||  || — || October 24, 2001 || Socorro || LINEAR || NYS || align=right data-sort-value="0.79" | 790 m || 
|-id=905 bgcolor=#FFC2E0
| 437905 ||  || — || December 13, 2001 || Socorro || LINEAR || APOPHAcritical || align=right data-sort-value="0.39" | 390 m || 
|-id=906 bgcolor=#d6d6d6
| 437906 ||  || — || December 15, 2001 || Socorro || LINEAR || — || align=right | 3.0 km || 
|-id=907 bgcolor=#d6d6d6
| 437907 ||  || — || November 20, 2001 || Socorro || LINEAR || — || align=right | 3.6 km || 
|-id=908 bgcolor=#FFC2E0
| 437908 ||  || — || December 9, 2001 || Mauna Kea || D. J. Tholen || AMOcritical || align=right data-sort-value="0.45" | 450 m || 
|-id=909 bgcolor=#d6d6d6
| 437909 ||  || — || January 14, 2002 || Socorro || LINEAR || EOS || align=right | 2.4 km || 
|-id=910 bgcolor=#E9E9E9
| 437910 ||  || — || December 23, 2001 || Anderson Mesa || LONEOS || — || align=right | 2.2 km || 
|-id=911 bgcolor=#d6d6d6
| 437911 ||  || — || January 9, 2002 || Socorro || LINEAR || Tj (2.98) || align=right | 3.6 km || 
|-id=912 bgcolor=#E9E9E9
| 437912 ||  || — || February 6, 2002 || Socorro || LINEAR || — || align=right | 2.2 km || 
|-id=913 bgcolor=#E9E9E9
| 437913 ||  || — || February 10, 2002 || Socorro || LINEAR || (5) || align=right data-sort-value="0.76" | 760 m || 
|-id=914 bgcolor=#E9E9E9
| 437914 ||  || — || March 12, 2002 || Socorro || LINEAR || — || align=right | 1.2 km || 
|-id=915 bgcolor=#C2E0FF
| 437915 ||  || — || April 7, 2002 || Cerro Tololo || M. W. Buie || res5:9critical || align=right | 293 km || 
|-id=916 bgcolor=#E9E9E9
| 437916 ||  || — || April 8, 2002 || Kitt Peak || Spacewatch || — || align=right | 1.6 km || 
|-id=917 bgcolor=#E9E9E9
| 437917 ||  || — || April 13, 2002 || Palomar || NEAT || — || align=right | 1.4 km || 
|-id=918 bgcolor=#E9E9E9
| 437918 ||  || — || May 3, 2002 || Anderson Mesa || LONEOS || — || align=right | 2.1 km || 
|-id=919 bgcolor=#E9E9E9
| 437919 ||  || — || May 8, 2002 || Socorro || LINEAR || — || align=right | 1.8 km || 
|-id=920 bgcolor=#E9E9E9
| 437920 ||  || — || June 6, 2002 || Socorro || LINEAR || — || align=right | 2.5 km || 
|-id=921 bgcolor=#E9E9E9
| 437921 ||  || — || May 7, 2002 || Socorro || LINEAR || — || align=right | 1.1 km || 
|-id=922 bgcolor=#FA8072
| 437922 ||  || — || July 12, 2002 || Palomar || NEAT || — || align=right data-sort-value="0.62" | 620 m || 
|-id=923 bgcolor=#E9E9E9
| 437923 ||  || — || July 10, 2002 || Palomar || NEAT || — || align=right | 2.5 km || 
|-id=924 bgcolor=#E9E9E9
| 437924 ||  || — || July 18, 2002 || Socorro || LINEAR || — || align=right | 2.9 km || 
|-id=925 bgcolor=#E9E9E9
| 437925 ||  || — || August 12, 2002 || Socorro || LINEAR || — || align=right | 2.5 km || 
|-id=926 bgcolor=#E9E9E9
| 437926 ||  || — || August 12, 2002 || Socorro || LINEAR || JUN || align=right | 1.1 km || 
|-id=927 bgcolor=#FA8072
| 437927 ||  || — || August 14, 2002 || Anderson Mesa || LONEOS || — || align=right data-sort-value="0.88" | 880 m || 
|-id=928 bgcolor=#E9E9E9
| 437928 ||  || — || August 15, 2002 || Palomar || NEAT || — || align=right | 2.6 km || 
|-id=929 bgcolor=#fefefe
| 437929 ||  || — || August 15, 2002 || Palomar || NEAT || — || align=right data-sort-value="0.68" | 680 m || 
|-id=930 bgcolor=#E9E9E9
| 437930 ||  || — || August 15, 2002 || Socorro || LINEAR || — || align=right | 1.7 km || 
|-id=931 bgcolor=#E9E9E9
| 437931 ||  || — || August 8, 2002 || Palomar || S. F. Hönig || MIS || align=right | 2.3 km || 
|-id=932 bgcolor=#fefefe
| 437932 ||  || — || August 8, 2002 || Palomar || S. F. Hönig || — || align=right data-sort-value="0.65" | 650 m || 
|-id=933 bgcolor=#fefefe
| 437933 ||  || — || August 15, 2002 || Palomar || NEAT || — || align=right data-sort-value="0.77" | 770 m || 
|-id=934 bgcolor=#fefefe
| 437934 ||  || — || August 16, 2002 || Haleakala || NEAT || — || align=right data-sort-value="0.69" | 690 m || 
|-id=935 bgcolor=#fefefe
| 437935 ||  || — || August 12, 2002 || Socorro || LINEAR || — || align=right data-sort-value="0.72" | 720 m || 
|-id=936 bgcolor=#E9E9E9
| 437936 ||  || — || August 30, 2002 || Socorro || LINEAR || — || align=right | 2.6 km || 
|-id=937 bgcolor=#fefefe
| 437937 ||  || — || August 16, 2002 || Palomar || NEAT || — || align=right data-sort-value="0.62" | 620 m || 
|-id=938 bgcolor=#fefefe
| 437938 ||  || — || August 30, 2002 || Palomar || NEAT || — || align=right data-sort-value="0.89" | 890 m || 
|-id=939 bgcolor=#fefefe
| 437939 ||  || — || August 26, 2002 || Palomar || NEAT || — || align=right data-sort-value="0.57" | 570 m || 
|-id=940 bgcolor=#E9E9E9
| 437940 ||  || — || August 28, 2002 || Palomar || NEAT || AEO || align=right data-sort-value="0.85" | 850 m || 
|-id=941 bgcolor=#E9E9E9
| 437941 ||  || — || August 18, 2002 || Palomar || NEAT || — || align=right | 1.6 km || 
|-id=942 bgcolor=#E9E9E9
| 437942 ||  || — || September 10, 2002 || Palomar || NEAT || — || align=right | 2.0 km || 
|-id=943 bgcolor=#E9E9E9
| 437943 ||  || — || September 12, 2002 || Palomar || NEAT || — || align=right | 2.1 km || 
|-id=944 bgcolor=#E9E9E9
| 437944 ||  || — || September 13, 2002 || Palomar || NEAT || — || align=right | 2.1 km || 
|-id=945 bgcolor=#E9E9E9
| 437945 ||  || — || September 13, 2002 || Palomar || NEAT || — || align=right | 2.0 km || 
|-id=946 bgcolor=#E9E9E9
| 437946 ||  || — || September 14, 2002 || Palomar || NEAT || GEF || align=right | 1.3 km || 
|-id=947 bgcolor=#E9E9E9
| 437947 ||  || — || September 11, 2002 || Palomar || M. White, M. Collins || HOF || align=right | 2.2 km || 
|-id=948 bgcolor=#E9E9E9
| 437948 ||  || — || September 13, 2002 || Palomar || NEAT || — || align=right | 1.3 km || 
|-id=949 bgcolor=#E9E9E9
| 437949 ||  || — || September 13, 2002 || Palomar || NEAT || — || align=right | 1.8 km || 
|-id=950 bgcolor=#E9E9E9
| 437950 ||  || — || September 13, 2002 || Palomar || NEAT || — || align=right | 1.9 km || 
|-id=951 bgcolor=#E9E9E9
| 437951 ||  || — || August 30, 2002 || Socorro || LINEAR || — || align=right | 1.8 km || 
|-id=952 bgcolor=#E9E9E9
| 437952 ||  || — || September 27, 2002 || Socorro || LINEAR || — || align=right | 2.4 km || 
|-id=953 bgcolor=#fefefe
| 437953 ||  || — || September 27, 2002 || Palomar || NEAT || H || align=right data-sort-value="0.65" | 650 m || 
|-id=954 bgcolor=#E9E9E9
| 437954 ||  || — || October 2, 2002 || Campo Imperatore || CINEOS || — || align=right | 2.7 km || 
|-id=955 bgcolor=#E9E9E9
| 437955 ||  || — || October 5, 2002 || Socorro || LINEAR || — || align=right | 2.6 km || 
|-id=956 bgcolor=#fefefe
| 437956 ||  || — || October 5, 2002 || Socorro || LINEAR || H || align=right data-sort-value="0.74" | 740 m || 
|-id=957 bgcolor=#fefefe
| 437957 ||  || — || October 4, 2002 || Apache Point || SDSS || — || align=right data-sort-value="0.63" | 630 m || 
|-id=958 bgcolor=#E9E9E9
| 437958 ||  || — || October 5, 2002 || Apache Point || SDSS || — || align=right | 1.5 km || 
|-id=959 bgcolor=#E9E9E9
| 437959 ||  || — || October 9, 2002 || Palomar || NEAT || — || align=right | 1.1 km || 
|-id=960 bgcolor=#E9E9E9
| 437960 ||  || — || October 29, 2002 || Apache Point || SDSS || — || align=right | 2.7 km || 
|-id=961 bgcolor=#fefefe
| 437961 ||  || — || October 31, 2002 || Socorro || LINEAR || H || align=right data-sort-value="0.92" | 920 m || 
|-id=962 bgcolor=#fefefe
| 437962 ||  || — || December 5, 2002 || Kitt Peak || Spacewatch || H || align=right data-sort-value="0.74" | 740 m || 
|-id=963 bgcolor=#d6d6d6
| 437963 ||  || — || December 6, 2002 || Socorro || LINEAR || — || align=right | 3.7 km || 
|-id=964 bgcolor=#fefefe
| 437964 ||  || — || December 11, 2002 || Socorro || LINEAR || H || align=right data-sort-value="0.82" | 820 m || 
|-id=965 bgcolor=#FFC2E0
| 437965 ||  || — || January 12, 2003 || Socorro || LINEAR || APOcritical || align=right data-sort-value="0.47" | 470 m || 
|-id=966 bgcolor=#fefefe
| 437966 ||  || — || March 7, 2003 || Anderson Mesa || LONEOS || — || align=right | 1.8 km || 
|-id=967 bgcolor=#d6d6d6
| 437967 ||  || — || March 27, 2003 || Kitt Peak || Spacewatch || — || align=right | 3.4 km || 
|-id=968 bgcolor=#fefefe
| 437968 ||  || — || April 9, 2003 || Palomar || NEAT || — || align=right data-sort-value="0.90" | 900 m || 
|-id=969 bgcolor=#d6d6d6
| 437969 ||  || — || April 26, 2003 || Kitt Peak || Spacewatch || — || align=right | 2.8 km || 
|-id=970 bgcolor=#E9E9E9
| 437970 ||  || — || July 3, 2003 || Kitt Peak || Spacewatch || — || align=right | 3.0 km || 
|-id=971 bgcolor=#E9E9E9
| 437971 ||  || — || July 3, 2003 || Anderson Mesa || LONEOS || EUN || align=right | 1.7 km || 
|-id=972 bgcolor=#E9E9E9
| 437972 ||  || — || August 22, 2003 || Socorro || LINEAR || — || align=right data-sort-value="0.96" | 960 m || 
|-id=973 bgcolor=#E9E9E9
| 437973 ||  || — || August 21, 2003 || Campo Imperatore || CINEOS || — || align=right | 1.6 km || 
|-id=974 bgcolor=#E9E9E9
| 437974 ||  || — || August 23, 2003 || Socorro || LINEAR || — || align=right | 1.1 km || 
|-id=975 bgcolor=#FA8072
| 437975 ||  || — || September 5, 2003 || Socorro || LINEAR || — || align=right | 1.5 km || 
|-id=976 bgcolor=#E9E9E9
| 437976 ||  || — || September 15, 2003 || Haleakala || NEAT || — || align=right data-sort-value="0.80" | 800 m || 
|-id=977 bgcolor=#E9E9E9
| 437977 ||  || — || September 17, 2003 || Palomar || NEAT || — || align=right | 1.8 km || 
|-id=978 bgcolor=#E9E9E9
| 437978 ||  || — || September 16, 2003 || Palomar || NEAT || — || align=right | 1.1 km || 
|-id=979 bgcolor=#E9E9E9
| 437979 ||  || — || September 16, 2003 || Anderson Mesa || LONEOS || — || align=right data-sort-value="0.87" | 870 m || 
|-id=980 bgcolor=#E9E9E9
| 437980 ||  || — || September 15, 2003 || Anderson Mesa || LONEOS || — || align=right | 1.8 km || 
|-id=981 bgcolor=#E9E9E9
| 437981 ||  || — || September 16, 2003 || Kitt Peak || Spacewatch || (5) || align=right data-sort-value="0.84" | 840 m || 
|-id=982 bgcolor=#E9E9E9
| 437982 ||  || — || September 19, 2003 || Palomar || NEAT || — || align=right | 1.1 km || 
|-id=983 bgcolor=#E9E9E9
| 437983 ||  || — || September 20, 2003 || Palomar || NEAT || EUN || align=right | 1.2 km || 
|-id=984 bgcolor=#E9E9E9
| 437984 ||  || — || September 19, 2003 || Anderson Mesa || LONEOS || — || align=right | 1.1 km || 
|-id=985 bgcolor=#E9E9E9
| 437985 ||  || — || September 30, 2003 || Kitt Peak || Spacewatch || — || align=right | 1.4 km || 
|-id=986 bgcolor=#E9E9E9
| 437986 ||  || — || September 29, 2003 || Anderson Mesa || LONEOS || — || align=right | 2.8 km || 
|-id=987 bgcolor=#E9E9E9
| 437987 ||  || — || September 27, 2003 || Socorro || LINEAR || — || align=right | 1.2 km || 
|-id=988 bgcolor=#E9E9E9
| 437988 ||  || — || September 27, 2003 || Apache Point || SDSS || — || align=right | 1.7 km || 
|-id=989 bgcolor=#E9E9E9
| 437989 ||  || — || September 19, 2003 || Kitt Peak || Spacewatch || — || align=right | 1.3 km || 
|-id=990 bgcolor=#E9E9E9
| 437990 ||  || — || October 15, 2003 || Palomar || NEAT || critical || align=right data-sort-value="0.98" | 980 m || 
|-id=991 bgcolor=#E9E9E9
| 437991 ||  || — || September 19, 2003 || Kitt Peak || Spacewatch || — || align=right | 1.6 km || 
|-id=992 bgcolor=#E9E9E9
| 437992 ||  || — || October 5, 2003 || Kitt Peak || Spacewatch || — || align=right | 3.4 km || 
|-id=993 bgcolor=#E9E9E9
| 437993 ||  || — || October 18, 2003 || Palomar || NEAT || — || align=right data-sort-value="0.85" | 850 m || 
|-id=994 bgcolor=#FFC2E0
| 437994 ||  || — || October 19, 2003 || Socorro || LINEAR || APO +1km || align=right | 1.1 km || 
|-id=995 bgcolor=#E9E9E9
| 437995 ||  || — || October 18, 2003 || Palomar || NEAT || EUN || align=right | 1.6 km || 
|-id=996 bgcolor=#E9E9E9
| 437996 ||  || — || October 20, 2003 || Socorro || LINEAR || (5) || align=right data-sort-value="0.84" | 840 m || 
|-id=997 bgcolor=#E9E9E9
| 437997 ||  || — || October 3, 2003 || Kitt Peak || Spacewatch || — || align=right | 1.6 km || 
|-id=998 bgcolor=#E9E9E9
| 437998 ||  || — || October 20, 2003 || Kitt Peak || Spacewatch || — || align=right | 1.4 km || 
|-id=999 bgcolor=#E9E9E9
| 437999 ||  || — || October 19, 2003 || Palomar || NEAT || ADE || align=right | 2.2 km || 
|-id=000 bgcolor=#E9E9E9
| 438000 ||  || — || October 21, 2003 || Anderson Mesa || LONEOS || — || align=right | 1.3 km || 
|}

References

External links 
 Discovery Circumstances: Numbered Minor Planets (435001)–(440000) (IAU Minor Planet Center)

0437